

341001–341100 

|-bgcolor=#E9E9E9
| 341001 ||  || — || March 16, 2007 || Catalina || CSS || — || align=right | 2.4 km || 
|-id=002 bgcolor=#fefefe
| 341002 ||  || — || January 27, 2007 || Mount Lemmon || Mount Lemmon Survey || MAS || align=right data-sort-value="0.78" | 780 m || 
|-id=003 bgcolor=#fefefe
| 341003 ||  || — || March 16, 2007 || Mount Lemmon || Mount Lemmon Survey || V || align=right data-sort-value="0.81" | 810 m || 
|-id=004 bgcolor=#C2FFFF
| 341004 ||  || — || March 20, 2007 || Kitt Peak || Spacewatch || L5 || align=right | 11 km || 
|-id=005 bgcolor=#fefefe
| 341005 ||  || — || March 20, 2007 || Kitt Peak || Spacewatch || V || align=right data-sort-value="0.78" | 780 m || 
|-id=006 bgcolor=#fefefe
| 341006 ||  || — || March 20, 2007 || Kitt Peak || Spacewatch || — || align=right data-sort-value="0.73" | 730 m || 
|-id=007 bgcolor=#fefefe
| 341007 ||  || — || March 20, 2007 || Mount Lemmon || Mount Lemmon Survey || V || align=right data-sort-value="0.82" | 820 m || 
|-id=008 bgcolor=#C2FFFF
| 341008 ||  || — || March 20, 2007 || Mount Lemmon || Mount Lemmon Survey || L5 || align=right | 8.7 km || 
|-id=009 bgcolor=#fefefe
| 341009 ||  || — || March 20, 2007 || Kitt Peak || Spacewatch || NYS || align=right data-sort-value="0.73" | 730 m || 
|-id=010 bgcolor=#fefefe
| 341010 ||  || — || March 20, 2007 || Kitt Peak || Spacewatch || MAS || align=right data-sort-value="0.96" | 960 m || 
|-id=011 bgcolor=#fefefe
| 341011 ||  || — || March 25, 2007 || Mount Lemmon || Mount Lemmon Survey || — || align=right data-sort-value="0.97" | 970 m || 
|-id=012 bgcolor=#fefefe
| 341012 ||  || — || March 25, 2007 || Mount Lemmon || Mount Lemmon Survey || V || align=right data-sort-value="0.66" | 660 m || 
|-id=013 bgcolor=#fefefe
| 341013 ||  || — || March 25, 2007 || Catalina || CSS || — || align=right data-sort-value="0.84" | 840 m || 
|-id=014 bgcolor=#fefefe
| 341014 ||  || — || October 9, 2005 || Kitt Peak || Spacewatch || ERI || align=right | 2.2 km || 
|-id=015 bgcolor=#C2FFFF
| 341015 ||  || — || March 16, 2007 || Mount Lemmon || Mount Lemmon Survey || L5 || align=right | 8.5 km || 
|-id=016 bgcolor=#fefefe
| 341016 ||  || — || March 19, 2007 || Mount Lemmon || Mount Lemmon Survey || FLO || align=right | 1.4 km || 
|-id=017 bgcolor=#C2FFFF
| 341017 ||  || — || March 26, 2007 || Mount Lemmon || Mount Lemmon Survey || L5 || align=right | 12 km || 
|-id=018 bgcolor=#fefefe
| 341018 ||  || — || March 16, 2007 || Catalina || CSS || ERI || align=right | 1.4 km || 
|-id=019 bgcolor=#fefefe
| 341019 ||  || — || April 9, 2007 || Lumezzane || Lumezzane Obs. || FLO || align=right data-sort-value="0.79" | 790 m || 
|-id=020 bgcolor=#fefefe
| 341020 ||  || — || March 10, 2007 || Mount Lemmon || Mount Lemmon Survey || NYS || align=right data-sort-value="0.68" | 680 m || 
|-id=021 bgcolor=#C2FFFF
| 341021 ||  || — || April 7, 2007 || Mount Lemmon || Mount Lemmon Survey || L5 || align=right | 8.9 km || 
|-id=022 bgcolor=#fefefe
| 341022 ||  || — || April 7, 2007 || Mount Lemmon || Mount Lemmon Survey || — || align=right data-sort-value="0.67" | 670 m || 
|-id=023 bgcolor=#C2FFFF
| 341023 ||  || — || April 7, 2007 || Mount Lemmon || Mount Lemmon Survey || L5 || align=right | 9.9 km || 
|-id=024 bgcolor=#fefefe
| 341024 ||  || — || March 13, 2007 || Kitt Peak || Spacewatch || — || align=right data-sort-value="0.71" | 710 m || 
|-id=025 bgcolor=#C2FFFF
| 341025 ||  || — || April 11, 2007 || Kitt Peak || Spacewatch || L5 || align=right | 9.9 km || 
|-id=026 bgcolor=#C2FFFF
| 341026 ||  || — || April 11, 2007 || Mount Lemmon || Mount Lemmon Survey || L5 || align=right | 8.7 km || 
|-id=027 bgcolor=#E9E9E9
| 341027 ||  || — || April 11, 2007 || Kitt Peak || Spacewatch || — || align=right data-sort-value="0.94" | 940 m || 
|-id=028 bgcolor=#fefefe
| 341028 ||  || — || April 11, 2007 || Kitt Peak || Spacewatch || — || align=right | 1.2 km || 
|-id=029 bgcolor=#E9E9E9
| 341029 ||  || — || April 11, 2007 || Kitt Peak || Spacewatch || — || align=right | 1.2 km || 
|-id=030 bgcolor=#E9E9E9
| 341030 ||  || — || April 11, 2007 || Kitt Peak || Spacewatch || — || align=right data-sort-value="0.98" | 980 m || 
|-id=031 bgcolor=#E9E9E9
| 341031 ||  || — || April 11, 2007 || Mount Lemmon || Mount Lemmon Survey || — || align=right | 1.8 km || 
|-id=032 bgcolor=#fefefe
| 341032 ||  || — || April 11, 2007 || Mount Lemmon || Mount Lemmon Survey || V || align=right data-sort-value="0.67" | 670 m || 
|-id=033 bgcolor=#E9E9E9
| 341033 ||  || — || April 11, 2007 || Mount Lemmon || Mount Lemmon Survey || — || align=right | 1.6 km || 
|-id=034 bgcolor=#E9E9E9
| 341034 ||  || — || April 14, 2007 || Kitt Peak || Spacewatch || — || align=right | 1.3 km || 
|-id=035 bgcolor=#E9E9E9
| 341035 ||  || — || April 11, 2007 || Siding Spring || SSS || — || align=right | 1.4 km || 
|-id=036 bgcolor=#fefefe
| 341036 ||  || — || April 14, 2007 || Kitt Peak || Spacewatch || — || align=right | 1.1 km || 
|-id=037 bgcolor=#fefefe
| 341037 ||  || — || April 14, 2007 || Kitt Peak || Spacewatch || NYS || align=right data-sort-value="0.87" | 870 m || 
|-id=038 bgcolor=#fefefe
| 341038 ||  || — || April 14, 2007 || Kitt Peak || Spacewatch || — || align=right data-sort-value="0.91" | 910 m || 
|-id=039 bgcolor=#fefefe
| 341039 ||  || — || April 14, 2007 || Kitt Peak || Spacewatch || — || align=right | 1.0 km || 
|-id=040 bgcolor=#fefefe
| 341040 ||  || — || April 14, 2007 || Mount Lemmon || Mount Lemmon Survey || — || align=right | 1.0 km || 
|-id=041 bgcolor=#fefefe
| 341041 ||  || — || April 14, 2007 || Kitt Peak || Spacewatch || — || align=right | 1.00 km || 
|-id=042 bgcolor=#fefefe
| 341042 ||  || — || April 15, 2007 || Kitt Peak || Spacewatch || MAS || align=right data-sort-value="0.80" | 800 m || 
|-id=043 bgcolor=#E9E9E9
| 341043 ||  || — || April 15, 2007 || Kitt Peak || Spacewatch || WIT || align=right | 1.2 km || 
|-id=044 bgcolor=#E9E9E9
| 341044 ||  || — || April 15, 2007 || Kitt Peak || Spacewatch || — || align=right | 1.5 km || 
|-id=045 bgcolor=#fefefe
| 341045 ||  || — || April 15, 2007 || Kitt Peak || Spacewatch || — || align=right | 1.3 km || 
|-id=046 bgcolor=#fefefe
| 341046 ||  || — || April 15, 2007 || Mount Lemmon || Mount Lemmon Survey || NYS || align=right data-sort-value="0.65" | 650 m || 
|-id=047 bgcolor=#fefefe
| 341047 ||  || — || April 15, 2007 || Mount Lemmon || Mount Lemmon Survey || V || align=right data-sort-value="0.83" | 830 m || 
|-id=048 bgcolor=#fefefe
| 341048 ||  || — || April 15, 2007 || Catalina || CSS || — || align=right | 1.0 km || 
|-id=049 bgcolor=#E9E9E9
| 341049 ||  || — || March 13, 2007 || Mount Lemmon || Mount Lemmon Survey || — || align=right | 1.1 km || 
|-id=050 bgcolor=#FFC2E0
| 341050 ||  || — || April 18, 2007 || Mount Lemmon || Mount Lemmon Survey || AMO || align=right data-sort-value="0.30" | 300 m || 
|-id=051 bgcolor=#E9E9E9
| 341051 ||  || — || April 16, 2007 || Socorro || LINEAR || JUN || align=right | 1.4 km || 
|-id=052 bgcolor=#C2FFFF
| 341052 ||  || — || April 16, 2007 || Mount Lemmon || Mount Lemmon Survey || L5 || align=right | 8.6 km || 
|-id=053 bgcolor=#fefefe
| 341053 ||  || — || April 16, 2007 || Mount Lemmon || Mount Lemmon Survey || NYS || align=right data-sort-value="0.74" | 740 m || 
|-id=054 bgcolor=#E9E9E9
| 341054 ||  || — || April 18, 2007 || Kitt Peak || Spacewatch || — || align=right | 1.6 km || 
|-id=055 bgcolor=#fefefe
| 341055 ||  || — || April 16, 2007 || Catalina || CSS || — || align=right | 1.3 km || 
|-id=056 bgcolor=#fefefe
| 341056 ||  || — || April 18, 2007 || Mount Lemmon || Mount Lemmon Survey || — || align=right | 1.4 km || 
|-id=057 bgcolor=#fefefe
| 341057 ||  || — || April 18, 2007 || Mount Lemmon || Mount Lemmon Survey || MAS || align=right data-sort-value="0.72" | 720 m || 
|-id=058 bgcolor=#E9E9E9
| 341058 ||  || — || April 19, 2007 || Kitt Peak || Spacewatch || POS || align=right | 3.1 km || 
|-id=059 bgcolor=#fefefe
| 341059 ||  || — || April 19, 2007 || Mount Lemmon || Mount Lemmon Survey || — || align=right data-sort-value="0.80" | 800 m || 
|-id=060 bgcolor=#fefefe
| 341060 ||  || — || April 18, 2007 || Kitt Peak || Spacewatch || — || align=right data-sort-value="0.82" | 820 m || 
|-id=061 bgcolor=#E9E9E9
| 341061 ||  || — || April 18, 2007 || Socorro || LINEAR || — || align=right | 1.3 km || 
|-id=062 bgcolor=#fefefe
| 341062 ||  || — || April 18, 2007 || Kitt Peak || Spacewatch || — || align=right data-sort-value="0.91" | 910 m || 
|-id=063 bgcolor=#fefefe
| 341063 ||  || — || April 19, 2007 || Anderson Mesa || LONEOS || FLO || align=right | 1.5 km || 
|-id=064 bgcolor=#E9E9E9
| 341064 ||  || — || April 19, 2007 || Kitt Peak || Spacewatch || RAF || align=right | 1.3 km || 
|-id=065 bgcolor=#fefefe
| 341065 ||  || — || April 20, 2007 || Kitt Peak || Spacewatch || — || align=right data-sort-value="0.68" | 680 m || 
|-id=066 bgcolor=#fefefe
| 341066 ||  || — || April 22, 2007 || Mount Lemmon || Mount Lemmon Survey || V || align=right data-sort-value="0.85" | 850 m || 
|-id=067 bgcolor=#E9E9E9
| 341067 ||  || — || April 19, 2007 || Lulin Observatory || LUSS || — || align=right | 1.5 km || 
|-id=068 bgcolor=#E9E9E9
| 341068 ||  || — || April 20, 2007 || Anderson Mesa || LONEOS || ADE || align=right | 4.1 km || 
|-id=069 bgcolor=#fefefe
| 341069 ||  || — || April 20, 2007 || Kitt Peak || Spacewatch || — || align=right data-sort-value="0.99" | 990 m || 
|-id=070 bgcolor=#E9E9E9
| 341070 ||  || — || April 20, 2007 || Kitt Peak || Spacewatch || RAF || align=right data-sort-value="0.88" | 880 m || 
|-id=071 bgcolor=#E9E9E9
| 341071 ||  || — || April 20, 2007 || Kitt Peak || Spacewatch || BAR || align=right | 1.1 km || 
|-id=072 bgcolor=#fefefe
| 341072 ||  || — || April 22, 2007 || Kitt Peak || Spacewatch || — || align=right data-sort-value="0.80" | 800 m || 
|-id=073 bgcolor=#E9E9E9
| 341073 ||  || — || April 22, 2007 || Kitt Peak || Spacewatch || — || align=right data-sort-value="0.91" | 910 m || 
|-id=074 bgcolor=#fefefe
| 341074 ||  || — || April 22, 2007 || Mount Lemmon || Mount Lemmon Survey || MAS || align=right data-sort-value="0.70" | 700 m || 
|-id=075 bgcolor=#fefefe
| 341075 ||  || — || April 22, 2007 || Mount Lemmon || Mount Lemmon Survey || — || align=right | 1.3 km || 
|-id=076 bgcolor=#fefefe
| 341076 ||  || — || April 24, 2007 || Mount Lemmon || Mount Lemmon Survey || — || align=right | 1.3 km || 
|-id=077 bgcolor=#E9E9E9
| 341077 ||  || — || April 14, 2007 || Kitt Peak || Spacewatch || — || align=right | 1.4 km || 
|-id=078 bgcolor=#fefefe
| 341078 ||  || — || August 22, 2004 || Kitt Peak || Spacewatch || — || align=right data-sort-value="0.88" | 880 m || 
|-id=079 bgcolor=#E9E9E9
| 341079 ||  || — || April 23, 2007 || Kitt Peak || Spacewatch || — || align=right | 1.1 km || 
|-id=080 bgcolor=#E9E9E9
| 341080 ||  || — || April 24, 2007 || Kitt Peak || Spacewatch || JUN || align=right | 1.1 km || 
|-id=081 bgcolor=#fefefe
| 341081 ||  || — || April 26, 2007 || Kitt Peak || Spacewatch || NYS || align=right data-sort-value="0.76" | 760 m || 
|-id=082 bgcolor=#E9E9E9
| 341082 ||  || — || April 24, 2007 || Kitt Peak || Spacewatch || — || align=right | 1.2 km || 
|-id=083 bgcolor=#fefefe
| 341083 ||  || — || April 24, 2007 || Kitt Peak || Spacewatch || — || align=right data-sort-value="0.91" | 910 m || 
|-id=084 bgcolor=#E9E9E9
| 341084 ||  || — || April 18, 2007 || Anderson Mesa || LONEOS || — || align=right | 3.2 km || 
|-id=085 bgcolor=#E9E9E9
| 341085 ||  || — || April 20, 2007 || Mount Lemmon || Mount Lemmon Survey || — || align=right | 1.6 km || 
|-id=086 bgcolor=#E9E9E9
| 341086 ||  || — || April 22, 2007 || Mount Lemmon || Mount Lemmon Survey || — || align=right | 1.2 km || 
|-id=087 bgcolor=#E9E9E9
| 341087 ||  || — || April 17, 2007 || Moletai || K. Černis, J. Zdanavičius || — || align=right | 1.5 km || 
|-id=088 bgcolor=#E9E9E9
| 341088 ||  || — || May 7, 2007 || Catalina || CSS || — || align=right | 1.6 km || 
|-id=089 bgcolor=#E9E9E9
| 341089 ||  || — || April 24, 2007 || Mount Lemmon || Mount Lemmon Survey || — || align=right | 1.9 km || 
|-id=090 bgcolor=#E9E9E9
| 341090 ||  || — || May 7, 2007 || Lulin || LUSS || — || align=right | 1.2 km || 
|-id=091 bgcolor=#E9E9E9
| 341091 ||  || — || May 7, 2007 || Lulin || LUSS || — || align=right | 2.7 km || 
|-id=092 bgcolor=#fefefe
| 341092 ||  || — || May 7, 2007 || Kitt Peak || Spacewatch || — || align=right | 1.2 km || 
|-id=093 bgcolor=#E9E9E9
| 341093 ||  || — || January 23, 2006 || Kitt Peak || Spacewatch || — || align=right | 1.4 km || 
|-id=094 bgcolor=#E9E9E9
| 341094 ||  || — || May 9, 2007 || Catalina || CSS || — || align=right | 1.5 km || 
|-id=095 bgcolor=#E9E9E9
| 341095 ||  || — || May 10, 2007 || Calvin-Rehoboth || L. A. Molnar || MAR || align=right | 1.4 km || 
|-id=096 bgcolor=#fefefe
| 341096 ||  || — || April 1, 2003 || Apache Point || SDSS || MAS || align=right data-sort-value="0.94" | 940 m || 
|-id=097 bgcolor=#fefefe
| 341097 ||  || — || May 9, 2007 || Mount Lemmon || Mount Lemmon Survey || V || align=right data-sort-value="0.72" | 720 m || 
|-id=098 bgcolor=#E9E9E9
| 341098 ||  || — || May 10, 2007 || Mount Lemmon || Mount Lemmon Survey || — || align=right | 1.5 km || 
|-id=099 bgcolor=#fefefe
| 341099 ||  || — || May 9, 2007 || Kitt Peak || Spacewatch || — || align=right | 1.2 km || 
|-id=100 bgcolor=#E9E9E9
| 341100 ||  || — || May 10, 2007 || Kitt Peak || Spacewatch || — || align=right data-sort-value="0.98" | 980 m || 
|}

341101–341200 

|-bgcolor=#E9E9E9
| 341101 ||  || — || May 11, 2007 || Mount Lemmon || Mount Lemmon Survey || — || align=right | 2.2 km || 
|-id=102 bgcolor=#fefefe
| 341102 ||  || — || May 9, 2007 || Mount Lemmon || Mount Lemmon Survey || MAS || align=right data-sort-value="0.73" | 730 m || 
|-id=103 bgcolor=#E9E9E9
| 341103 ||  || — || May 13, 2007 || Kitt Peak || Spacewatch || EUN || align=right | 1.9 km || 
|-id=104 bgcolor=#fefefe
| 341104 ||  || — || May 17, 2007 || Kitt Peak || Spacewatch || — || align=right data-sort-value="0.98" | 980 m || 
|-id=105 bgcolor=#E9E9E9
| 341105 ||  || — || March 26, 2007 || Kitt Peak || Spacewatch || — || align=right | 1.1 km || 
|-id=106 bgcolor=#E9E9E9
| 341106 ||  || — || May 25, 2007 || Mount Lemmon || Mount Lemmon Survey || — || align=right | 1.4 km || 
|-id=107 bgcolor=#E9E9E9
| 341107 ||  || — || May 23, 2007 || Reedy Creek || J. Broughton || — || align=right | 1.6 km || 
|-id=108 bgcolor=#E9E9E9
| 341108 ||  || — || May 17, 2007 || Catalina || CSS || JUN || align=right | 1.4 km || 
|-id=109 bgcolor=#E9E9E9
| 341109 || 2007 LQ || — || June 8, 2007 || Andrushivka || Andrushivka Obs. || — || align=right | 1.3 km || 
|-id=110 bgcolor=#E9E9E9
| 341110 ||  || — || June 7, 2007 || Kitt Peak || Spacewatch || — || align=right data-sort-value="0.76" | 760 m || 
|-id=111 bgcolor=#E9E9E9
| 341111 ||  || — || June 8, 2007 || Kitt Peak || Spacewatch || — || align=right | 1.8 km || 
|-id=112 bgcolor=#E9E9E9
| 341112 ||  || — || June 8, 2007 || Kitt Peak || Spacewatch || — || align=right | 1.4 km || 
|-id=113 bgcolor=#E9E9E9
| 341113 ||  || — || June 7, 2007 || Kitt Peak || Spacewatch || — || align=right | 1.1 km || 
|-id=114 bgcolor=#fefefe
| 341114 ||  || — || June 8, 2007 || Kitt Peak || Spacewatch || — || align=right | 1.0 km || 
|-id=115 bgcolor=#fefefe
| 341115 ||  || — || May 24, 2007 || Mount Lemmon || Mount Lemmon Survey || — || align=right data-sort-value="0.84" | 840 m || 
|-id=116 bgcolor=#fefefe
| 341116 ||  || — || June 9, 2007 || Kitt Peak || Spacewatch || — || align=right | 1.1 km || 
|-id=117 bgcolor=#E9E9E9
| 341117 ||  || — || June 10, 2007 || Kitt Peak || Spacewatch || — || align=right data-sort-value="0.96" | 960 m || 
|-id=118 bgcolor=#E9E9E9
| 341118 ||  || — || June 12, 2007 || La Sagra || OAM Obs. || — || align=right | 2.3 km || 
|-id=119 bgcolor=#E9E9E9
| 341119 ||  || — || June 7, 2007 || Kitt Peak || Spacewatch || — || align=right | 1.2 km || 
|-id=120 bgcolor=#fefefe
| 341120 ||  || — || June 11, 2007 || Kitt Peak || Spacewatch || V || align=right data-sort-value="0.78" | 780 m || 
|-id=121 bgcolor=#E9E9E9
| 341121 ||  || — || June 10, 2007 || Kitt Peak || Spacewatch || — || align=right | 1.2 km || 
|-id=122 bgcolor=#E9E9E9
| 341122 ||  || — || June 15, 2007 || Kitt Peak || Spacewatch || — || align=right | 1.5 km || 
|-id=123 bgcolor=#E9E9E9
| 341123 ||  || — || June 15, 2007 || Kitt Peak || Spacewatch || — || align=right | 1.5 km || 
|-id=124 bgcolor=#E9E9E9
| 341124 ||  || — || June 15, 2007 || Kitt Peak || Spacewatch || — || align=right | 3.1 km || 
|-id=125 bgcolor=#E9E9E9
| 341125 || 2007 MC || — || June 16, 2007 || Tiki || S. F. Hönig, N. Teamo || — || align=right | 1.7 km || 
|-id=126 bgcolor=#E9E9E9
| 341126 ||  || — || June 16, 2007 || Tiki || S. F. Hönig, N. Teamo || — || align=right | 2.4 km || 
|-id=127 bgcolor=#E9E9E9
| 341127 ||  || — || June 16, 2007 || Kitt Peak || Spacewatch || MRX || align=right | 1.3 km || 
|-id=128 bgcolor=#E9E9E9
| 341128 ||  || — || June 18, 2007 || Kitt Peak || Spacewatch || — || align=right | 2.0 km || 
|-id=129 bgcolor=#E9E9E9
| 341129 ||  || — || June 17, 2007 || Kitt Peak || Spacewatch || EUN || align=right | 1.4 km || 
|-id=130 bgcolor=#E9E9E9
| 341130 ||  || — || June 17, 2007 || Kitt Peak || Spacewatch || CLO || align=right | 2.1 km || 
|-id=131 bgcolor=#E9E9E9
| 341131 ||  || — || June 17, 2007 || Kitt Peak || Spacewatch || — || align=right | 1.8 km || 
|-id=132 bgcolor=#E9E9E9
| 341132 ||  || — || June 21, 2007 || Mount Lemmon || Mount Lemmon Survey || — || align=right | 2.2 km || 
|-id=133 bgcolor=#E9E9E9
| 341133 ||  || — || June 22, 2007 || Kitt Peak || Spacewatch || EUN || align=right | 1.3 km || 
|-id=134 bgcolor=#E9E9E9
| 341134 ||  || — || June 23, 2007 || Kitt Peak || Spacewatch || — || align=right | 1.9 km || 
|-id=135 bgcolor=#E9E9E9
| 341135 ||  || — || July 16, 2007 || La Sagra || OAM Obs. || GAL || align=right | 2.3 km || 
|-id=136 bgcolor=#E9E9E9
| 341136 ||  || — || July 21, 2007 || Lulin || LUSS || — || align=right | 2.1 km || 
|-id=137 bgcolor=#E9E9E9
| 341137 ||  || — || July 27, 2007 || Dauban || Chante-Perdrix Obs. || — || align=right | 3.3 km || 
|-id=138 bgcolor=#E9E9E9
| 341138 ||  || — || July 18, 2007 || Mount Lemmon || Mount Lemmon Survey || — || align=right | 3.3 km || 
|-id=139 bgcolor=#E9E9E9
| 341139 ||  || — || August 5, 2007 || Socorro || LINEAR || — || align=right | 2.1 km || 
|-id=140 bgcolor=#E9E9E9
| 341140 ||  || — || August 6, 2007 || Socorro || LINEAR || — || align=right | 3.3 km || 
|-id=141 bgcolor=#E9E9E9
| 341141 ||  || — || August 9, 2007 || Tiki || S. F. Hönig, N. Teamo || GAL || align=right | 2.3 km || 
|-id=142 bgcolor=#E9E9E9
| 341142 ||  || — || August 9, 2007 || Socorro || LINEAR || — || align=right | 2.6 km || 
|-id=143 bgcolor=#E9E9E9
| 341143 ||  || — || August 8, 2007 || Socorro || LINEAR || — || align=right | 2.6 km || 
|-id=144 bgcolor=#E9E9E9
| 341144 ||  || — || August 8, 2007 || Socorro || LINEAR || — || align=right | 3.6 km || 
|-id=145 bgcolor=#E9E9E9
| 341145 ||  || — || August 8, 2007 || Socorro || LINEAR || DOR || align=right | 3.9 km || 
|-id=146 bgcolor=#d6d6d6
| 341146 ||  || — || August 8, 2007 || Socorro || LINEAR || — || align=right | 3.8 km || 
|-id=147 bgcolor=#E9E9E9
| 341147 ||  || — || August 9, 2007 || Kitt Peak || Spacewatch || — || align=right | 2.1 km || 
|-id=148 bgcolor=#E9E9E9
| 341148 ||  || — || August 14, 2007 || Socorro || LINEAR || — || align=right | 2.8 km || 
|-id=149 bgcolor=#E9E9E9
| 341149 ||  || — || August 15, 2007 || Altschwendt || W. Ries || — || align=right | 2.2 km || 
|-id=150 bgcolor=#d6d6d6
| 341150 ||  || — || August 14, 2007 || Siding Spring || SSS || BRA || align=right | 2.3 km || 
|-id=151 bgcolor=#E9E9E9
| 341151 ||  || — || August 8, 2007 || Socorro || LINEAR || EUN || align=right | 2.0 km || 
|-id=152 bgcolor=#E9E9E9
| 341152 ||  || — || April 2, 2006 || Kitt Peak || Spacewatch || — || align=right | 2.5 km || 
|-id=153 bgcolor=#E9E9E9
| 341153 ||  || — || August 5, 2007 || Socorro || LINEAR || INO || align=right | 1.7 km || 
|-id=154 bgcolor=#E9E9E9
| 341154 ||  || — || August 6, 2007 || Dauban || Chante-Perdrix Obs. || DOR || align=right | 2.9 km || 
|-id=155 bgcolor=#E9E9E9
| 341155 ||  || — || October 1, 2003 || Anderson Mesa || LONEOS || — || align=right | 3.2 km || 
|-id=156 bgcolor=#d6d6d6
| 341156 ||  || — || August 9, 2007 || Socorro || LINEAR || BRA || align=right | 1.8 km || 
|-id=157 bgcolor=#E9E9E9
| 341157 ||  || — || August 13, 2007 || Socorro || LINEAR || — || align=right | 2.5 km || 
|-id=158 bgcolor=#d6d6d6
| 341158 ||  || — || August 10, 2007 || Kitt Peak || Spacewatch || KOR || align=right | 1.4 km || 
|-id=159 bgcolor=#d6d6d6
| 341159 ||  || — || August 10, 2007 || Kitt Peak || Spacewatch || KOR || align=right | 1.3 km || 
|-id=160 bgcolor=#E9E9E9
| 341160 ||  || — || August 14, 2007 || Siding Spring || SSS || INO || align=right | 1.6 km || 
|-id=161 bgcolor=#E9E9E9
| 341161 ||  || — || August 10, 2007 || Kitt Peak || Spacewatch || MRX || align=right | 1.2 km || 
|-id=162 bgcolor=#E9E9E9
| 341162 ||  || — || August 12, 2007 || Purple Mountain || PMO NEO || HOF || align=right | 3.0 km || 
|-id=163 bgcolor=#E9E9E9
| 341163 ||  || — || August 10, 2007 || Kitt Peak || Spacewatch || EUN || align=right | 1.4 km || 
|-id=164 bgcolor=#E9E9E9
| 341164 ||  || — || August 22, 2007 || Socorro || LINEAR || MRX || align=right | 1.5 km || 
|-id=165 bgcolor=#d6d6d6
| 341165 ||  || — || August 24, 2007 || Kitt Peak || Spacewatch || KOR || align=right | 1.4 km || 
|-id=166 bgcolor=#d6d6d6
| 341166 ||  || — || August 24, 2007 || Kitt Peak || Spacewatch || KAR || align=right | 1.2 km || 
|-id=167 bgcolor=#E9E9E9
| 341167 ||  || — || August 24, 2007 || Kitt Peak || Spacewatch || — || align=right | 2.4 km || 
|-id=168 bgcolor=#E9E9E9
| 341168 ||  || — || August 24, 2007 || Kitt Peak || Spacewatch || — || align=right | 2.1 km || 
|-id=169 bgcolor=#E9E9E9
| 341169 ||  || — || August 24, 2007 || Kitt Peak || Spacewatch || WIT || align=right data-sort-value="0.96" | 960 m || 
|-id=170 bgcolor=#d6d6d6
| 341170 ||  || — || August 24, 2007 || Kitt Peak || Spacewatch || — || align=right | 2.3 km || 
|-id=171 bgcolor=#E9E9E9
| 341171 ||  || — || August 23, 2007 || Kitt Peak || Spacewatch || NEM || align=right | 2.8 km || 
|-id=172 bgcolor=#E9E9E9
| 341172 ||  || — || August 23, 2007 || Kitt Peak || Spacewatch || — || align=right | 2.7 km || 
|-id=173 bgcolor=#d6d6d6
| 341173 || 2007 RX || — || September 3, 2007 || Eskridge || G. Hug || — || align=right | 3.3 km || 
|-id=174 bgcolor=#d6d6d6
| 341174 ||  || — || September 5, 2007 || Marly || P. Kocher || INA || align=right | 3.2 km || 
|-id=175 bgcolor=#d6d6d6
| 341175 ||  || — || September 8, 2007 || Eskridge || G. Hug || — || align=right | 3.1 km || 
|-id=176 bgcolor=#E9E9E9
| 341176 ||  || — || September 3, 2007 || Catalina || CSS || INO || align=right | 1.8 km || 
|-id=177 bgcolor=#E9E9E9
| 341177 ||  || — || September 3, 2007 || Catalina || CSS || — || align=right | 3.2 km || 
|-id=178 bgcolor=#E9E9E9
| 341178 ||  || — || September 11, 2007 || Eskridge || G. Hug || HOF || align=right | 2.8 km || 
|-id=179 bgcolor=#fefefe
| 341179 ||  || — || September 11, 2007 || Dauban || Chante-Perdrix Obs. || H || align=right data-sort-value="0.87" | 870 m || 
|-id=180 bgcolor=#E9E9E9
| 341180 ||  || — || September 13, 2007 || Eskridge || G. Hug || — || align=right | 2.5 km || 
|-id=181 bgcolor=#d6d6d6
| 341181 ||  || — || September 12, 2007 || Dauban || Chante-Perdrix Obs. || — || align=right | 4.1 km || 
|-id=182 bgcolor=#d6d6d6
| 341182 ||  || — || September 3, 2007 || Catalina || CSS || — || align=right | 2.5 km || 
|-id=183 bgcolor=#d6d6d6
| 341183 ||  || — || September 3, 2007 || Catalina || CSS || — || align=right | 3.1 km || 
|-id=184 bgcolor=#E9E9E9
| 341184 ||  || — || September 4, 2007 || Catalina || CSS || — || align=right | 2.7 km || 
|-id=185 bgcolor=#E9E9E9
| 341185 ||  || — || September 5, 2007 || Catalina || CSS || CLO || align=right | 3.1 km || 
|-id=186 bgcolor=#d6d6d6
| 341186 ||  || — || September 9, 2007 || Kitt Peak || Spacewatch || — || align=right | 3.3 km || 
|-id=187 bgcolor=#E9E9E9
| 341187 ||  || — || September 9, 2007 || Mount Lemmon || Mount Lemmon Survey || AST || align=right | 1.5 km || 
|-id=188 bgcolor=#d6d6d6
| 341188 ||  || — || September 9, 2007 || Kitt Peak || Spacewatch || — || align=right | 2.2 km || 
|-id=189 bgcolor=#d6d6d6
| 341189 ||  || — || September 9, 2007 || Kitt Peak || Spacewatch || — || align=right | 4.0 km || 
|-id=190 bgcolor=#d6d6d6
| 341190 ||  || — || September 9, 2007 || Kitt Peak || Spacewatch || — || align=right | 2.6 km || 
|-id=191 bgcolor=#d6d6d6
| 341191 ||  || — || September 9, 2007 || Kitt Peak || Spacewatch || EOS || align=right | 2.4 km || 
|-id=192 bgcolor=#d6d6d6
| 341192 ||  || — || September 9, 2007 || Kitt Peak || Spacewatch || CHA || align=right | 2.5 km || 
|-id=193 bgcolor=#E9E9E9
| 341193 ||  || — || September 10, 2007 || Catalina || CSS || — || align=right | 3.0 km || 
|-id=194 bgcolor=#d6d6d6
| 341194 ||  || — || September 10, 2007 || Mount Lemmon || Mount Lemmon Survey || BRA || align=right | 1.5 km || 
|-id=195 bgcolor=#E9E9E9
| 341195 ||  || — || September 10, 2007 || Mount Lemmon || Mount Lemmon Survey || — || align=right | 2.3 km || 
|-id=196 bgcolor=#E9E9E9
| 341196 ||  || — || September 10, 2007 || Mount Lemmon || Mount Lemmon Survey || HEN || align=right data-sort-value="0.96" | 960 m || 
|-id=197 bgcolor=#E9E9E9
| 341197 ||  || — || September 10, 2007 || Kitt Peak || Spacewatch || — || align=right | 3.6 km || 
|-id=198 bgcolor=#E9E9E9
| 341198 ||  || — || September 10, 2007 || Kitt Peak || Spacewatch || HEN || align=right | 1.5 km || 
|-id=199 bgcolor=#E9E9E9
| 341199 ||  || — || September 10, 2007 || Kitt Peak || Spacewatch || — || align=right | 1.7 km || 
|-id=200 bgcolor=#d6d6d6
| 341200 ||  || — || September 10, 2007 || Mount Lemmon || Mount Lemmon Survey || KOR || align=right | 1.3 km || 
|}

341201–341300 

|-bgcolor=#E9E9E9
| 341201 ||  || — || September 10, 2007 || Mount Lemmon || Mount Lemmon Survey || GEF || align=right | 1.6 km || 
|-id=202 bgcolor=#E9E9E9
| 341202 ||  || — || September 10, 2007 || Mount Lemmon || Mount Lemmon Survey || — || align=right | 3.1 km || 
|-id=203 bgcolor=#d6d6d6
| 341203 ||  || — || September 10, 2007 || Mount Lemmon || Mount Lemmon Survey || — || align=right | 4.1 km || 
|-id=204 bgcolor=#d6d6d6
| 341204 ||  || — || September 10, 2007 || Kitt Peak || Spacewatch || CHA || align=right | 2.6 km || 
|-id=205 bgcolor=#E9E9E9
| 341205 ||  || — || September 11, 2007 || Mount Lemmon || Mount Lemmon Survey || AGN || align=right | 1.5 km || 
|-id=206 bgcolor=#E9E9E9
| 341206 ||  || — || September 11, 2007 || Kitt Peak || Spacewatch || — || align=right | 2.9 km || 
|-id=207 bgcolor=#E9E9E9
| 341207 ||  || — || September 11, 2007 || Mount Lemmon || Mount Lemmon Survey || WIT || align=right | 1.1 km || 
|-id=208 bgcolor=#d6d6d6
| 341208 ||  || — || September 11, 2007 || Kitt Peak || Spacewatch || critical || align=right | 2.0 km || 
|-id=209 bgcolor=#E9E9E9
| 341209 ||  || — || September 11, 2007 || Kitt Peak || Spacewatch || HOF || align=right | 2.6 km || 
|-id=210 bgcolor=#E9E9E9
| 341210 ||  || — || September 11, 2007 || Kitt Peak || Spacewatch || AGN || align=right | 1.2 km || 
|-id=211 bgcolor=#d6d6d6
| 341211 ||  || — || September 11, 2007 || Kitt Peak || Spacewatch || — || align=right | 2.6 km || 
|-id=212 bgcolor=#E9E9E9
| 341212 ||  || — || September 12, 2007 || Mount Lemmon || Mount Lemmon Survey || — || align=right | 2.9 km || 
|-id=213 bgcolor=#E9E9E9
| 341213 ||  || — || September 12, 2007 || Mount Lemmon || Mount Lemmon Survey || — || align=right | 3.0 km || 
|-id=214 bgcolor=#d6d6d6
| 341214 ||  || — || September 12, 2007 || Mount Lemmon || Mount Lemmon Survey || — || align=right | 2.2 km || 
|-id=215 bgcolor=#d6d6d6
| 341215 ||  || — || September 12, 2007 || Mount Lemmon || Mount Lemmon Survey || — || align=right | 3.4 km || 
|-id=216 bgcolor=#d6d6d6
| 341216 ||  || — || September 12, 2007 || Mount Lemmon || Mount Lemmon Survey || — || align=right | 2.3 km || 
|-id=217 bgcolor=#d6d6d6
| 341217 ||  || — || September 12, 2007 || Mount Lemmon || Mount Lemmon Survey || EOS || align=right | 2.0 km || 
|-id=218 bgcolor=#E9E9E9
| 341218 ||  || — || September 12, 2007 || Mount Lemmon || Mount Lemmon Survey || — || align=right | 2.2 km || 
|-id=219 bgcolor=#d6d6d6
| 341219 ||  || — || September 12, 2007 || Mount Lemmon || Mount Lemmon Survey || — || align=right | 2.7 km || 
|-id=220 bgcolor=#d6d6d6
| 341220 ||  || — || September 10, 2007 || Kitt Peak || Spacewatch || — || align=right | 3.7 km || 
|-id=221 bgcolor=#d6d6d6
| 341221 ||  || — || September 12, 2007 || Mount Lemmon || Mount Lemmon Survey || KOR || align=right | 1.2 km || 
|-id=222 bgcolor=#d6d6d6
| 341222 ||  || — || September 15, 2007 || Lulin || LUSS || — || align=right | 4.0 km || 
|-id=223 bgcolor=#fefefe
| 341223 ||  || — || September 13, 2007 || Socorro || LINEAR || H || align=right data-sort-value="0.72" | 720 m || 
|-id=224 bgcolor=#d6d6d6
| 341224 ||  || — || September 13, 2007 || Socorro || LINEAR || — || align=right | 4.0 km || 
|-id=225 bgcolor=#E9E9E9
| 341225 ||  || — || September 14, 2007 || Socorro || LINEAR || NEM || align=right | 2.9 km || 
|-id=226 bgcolor=#E9E9E9
| 341226 ||  || — || September 14, 2007 || Socorro || LINEAR || — || align=right | 3.4 km || 
|-id=227 bgcolor=#d6d6d6
| 341227 ||  || — || September 10, 2007 || Kitt Peak || Spacewatch || — || align=right | 4.3 km || 
|-id=228 bgcolor=#d6d6d6
| 341228 ||  || — || September 14, 2007 || Catalina || CSS || — || align=right | 3.3 km || 
|-id=229 bgcolor=#d6d6d6
| 341229 ||  || — || May 4, 2006 || Mount Lemmon || Mount Lemmon Survey || — || align=right | 2.3 km || 
|-id=230 bgcolor=#E9E9E9
| 341230 ||  || — || September 10, 2007 || Kitt Peak || Spacewatch || — || align=right | 1.5 km || 
|-id=231 bgcolor=#E9E9E9
| 341231 ||  || — || September 10, 2007 || Mount Lemmon || Mount Lemmon Survey || AGN || align=right | 1.1 km || 
|-id=232 bgcolor=#E9E9E9
| 341232 ||  || — || September 12, 2007 || Mount Lemmon || Mount Lemmon Survey || — || align=right | 2.2 km || 
|-id=233 bgcolor=#E9E9E9
| 341233 ||  || — || September 13, 2007 || Goodricke-Pigott || R. A. Tucker || — || align=right | 2.4 km || 
|-id=234 bgcolor=#E9E9E9
| 341234 ||  || — || September 10, 2007 || Kitt Peak || Spacewatch || — || align=right | 2.4 km || 
|-id=235 bgcolor=#d6d6d6
| 341235 ||  || — || September 10, 2007 || Kitt Peak || Spacewatch || — || align=right | 2.6 km || 
|-id=236 bgcolor=#E9E9E9
| 341236 ||  || — || September 10, 2007 || Kitt Peak || Spacewatch || — || align=right | 2.1 km || 
|-id=237 bgcolor=#E9E9E9
| 341237 ||  || — || September 10, 2007 || Kitt Peak || Spacewatch || — || align=right | 2.3 km || 
|-id=238 bgcolor=#d6d6d6
| 341238 ||  || — || September 10, 2007 || Kitt Peak || Spacewatch || — || align=right | 3.1 km || 
|-id=239 bgcolor=#d6d6d6
| 341239 ||  || — || September 10, 2007 || Kitt Peak || Spacewatch || — || align=right | 2.8 km || 
|-id=240 bgcolor=#d6d6d6
| 341240 ||  || — || September 8, 2007 || Catalina || CSS || — || align=right | 3.9 km || 
|-id=241 bgcolor=#E9E9E9
| 341241 ||  || — || September 9, 2007 || Mount Lemmon || Mount Lemmon Survey || AGN || align=right | 1.4 km || 
|-id=242 bgcolor=#d6d6d6
| 341242 ||  || — || September 10, 2007 || Kitt Peak || Spacewatch || — || align=right | 3.4 km || 
|-id=243 bgcolor=#d6d6d6
| 341243 ||  || — || September 10, 2007 || Mount Lemmon || Mount Lemmon Survey || — || align=right | 4.0 km || 
|-id=244 bgcolor=#E9E9E9
| 341244 ||  || — || September 10, 2007 || Catalina || CSS || — || align=right | 2.9 km || 
|-id=245 bgcolor=#d6d6d6
| 341245 ||  || — || September 11, 2007 || Kitt Peak || Spacewatch || — || align=right | 2.2 km || 
|-id=246 bgcolor=#d6d6d6
| 341246 ||  || — || September 13, 2007 || Kitt Peak || Spacewatch || — || align=right | 2.8 km || 
|-id=247 bgcolor=#d6d6d6
| 341247 ||  || — || September 9, 2007 || Mount Lemmon || Mount Lemmon Survey || — || align=right | 2.9 km || 
|-id=248 bgcolor=#E9E9E9
| 341248 ||  || — || September 13, 2007 || Kitt Peak || Spacewatch || — || align=right | 2.0 km || 
|-id=249 bgcolor=#d6d6d6
| 341249 ||  || — || September 9, 2007 || Kitt Peak || Spacewatch || — || align=right | 2.8 km || 
|-id=250 bgcolor=#d6d6d6
| 341250 ||  || — || September 10, 2007 || Kitt Peak || Spacewatch || KAR || align=right | 1.3 km || 
|-id=251 bgcolor=#d6d6d6
| 341251 ||  || — || September 10, 2007 || Kitt Peak || Spacewatch || KOR || align=right | 1.7 km || 
|-id=252 bgcolor=#d6d6d6
| 341252 ||  || — || September 11, 2007 || Lulin || LUSS || — || align=right | 4.4 km || 
|-id=253 bgcolor=#E9E9E9
| 341253 ||  || — || September 12, 2007 || Kitt Peak || Spacewatch || HOF || align=right | 2.4 km || 
|-id=254 bgcolor=#E9E9E9
| 341254 ||  || — || September 12, 2007 || Kitt Peak || Spacewatch || AGN || align=right | 1.3 km || 
|-id=255 bgcolor=#E9E9E9
| 341255 ||  || — || September 13, 2007 || Catalina || CSS || — || align=right | 2.4 km || 
|-id=256 bgcolor=#d6d6d6
| 341256 ||  || — || September 10, 2007 || Mount Lemmon || Mount Lemmon Survey || — || align=right | 3.1 km || 
|-id=257 bgcolor=#FA8072
| 341257 ||  || — || September 11, 2007 || Kitt Peak || Spacewatch || H || align=right data-sort-value="0.78" | 780 m || 
|-id=258 bgcolor=#d6d6d6
| 341258 ||  || — || September 12, 2007 || Catalina || CSS || — || align=right | 3.4 km || 
|-id=259 bgcolor=#d6d6d6
| 341259 ||  || — || September 12, 2007 || Catalina || CSS || — || align=right | 3.3 km || 
|-id=260 bgcolor=#d6d6d6
| 341260 ||  || — || September 12, 2007 || Catalina || CSS || — || align=right | 4.0 km || 
|-id=261 bgcolor=#E9E9E9
| 341261 ||  || — || September 12, 2007 || Mount Lemmon || Mount Lemmon Survey || — || align=right | 2.9 km || 
|-id=262 bgcolor=#E9E9E9
| 341262 ||  || — || September 12, 2007 || Mount Lemmon || Mount Lemmon Survey || — || align=right | 2.3 km || 
|-id=263 bgcolor=#d6d6d6
| 341263 ||  || — || September 13, 2007 || Mount Lemmon || Mount Lemmon Survey || — || align=right | 2.7 km || 
|-id=264 bgcolor=#d6d6d6
| 341264 ||  || — || September 13, 2007 || Kitt Peak || Spacewatch || — || align=right | 3.8 km || 
|-id=265 bgcolor=#E9E9E9
| 341265 ||  || — || September 13, 2007 || Kitt Peak || Spacewatch || PAD || align=right | 1.7 km || 
|-id=266 bgcolor=#E9E9E9
| 341266 ||  || — || September 14, 2007 || Kitt Peak || Spacewatch || — || align=right | 2.7 km || 
|-id=267 bgcolor=#d6d6d6
| 341267 ||  || — || September 14, 2007 || Kitt Peak || Spacewatch || — || align=right | 2.6 km || 
|-id=268 bgcolor=#E9E9E9
| 341268 ||  || — || September 14, 2007 || Kitt Peak || Spacewatch || — || align=right | 2.0 km || 
|-id=269 bgcolor=#E9E9E9
| 341269 ||  || — || September 14, 2007 || Kitt Peak || Spacewatch || — || align=right | 2.4 km || 
|-id=270 bgcolor=#d6d6d6
| 341270 ||  || — || September 15, 2007 || Mount Lemmon || Mount Lemmon Survey || — || align=right | 3.8 km || 
|-id=271 bgcolor=#d6d6d6
| 341271 ||  || — || September 15, 2007 || Mount Lemmon || Mount Lemmon Survey || — || align=right | 4.5 km || 
|-id=272 bgcolor=#d6d6d6
| 341272 ||  || — || September 15, 2007 || Mount Lemmon || Mount Lemmon Survey || — || align=right | 3.2 km || 
|-id=273 bgcolor=#E9E9E9
| 341273 ||  || — || September 13, 2007 || Catalina || CSS || — || align=right | 3.5 km || 
|-id=274 bgcolor=#d6d6d6
| 341274 ||  || — || September 13, 2007 || Catalina || CSS || — || align=right | 4.0 km || 
|-id=275 bgcolor=#C7FF8F
| 341275 ||  || — || September 15, 2007 || Palomar || Palomar Obs. || centaur || align=right | 84 km || 
|-id=276 bgcolor=#d6d6d6
| 341276 ||  || — || September 9, 2007 || Kitt Peak || Spacewatch || — || align=right | 2.9 km || 
|-id=277 bgcolor=#d6d6d6
| 341277 ||  || — || September 10, 2007 || Kitt Peak || Spacewatch || — || align=right | 2.8 km || 
|-id=278 bgcolor=#d6d6d6
| 341278 ||  || — || September 11, 2007 || Mount Lemmon || Mount Lemmon Survey || K-2 || align=right | 1.4 km || 
|-id=279 bgcolor=#E9E9E9
| 341279 ||  || — || September 12, 2007 || Mount Lemmon || Mount Lemmon Survey || AGN || align=right | 1.2 km || 
|-id=280 bgcolor=#d6d6d6
| 341280 ||  || — || September 12, 2007 || Mount Lemmon || Mount Lemmon Survey || — || align=right | 2.5 km || 
|-id=281 bgcolor=#d6d6d6
| 341281 ||  || — || September 12, 2007 || Mount Lemmon || Mount Lemmon Survey || — || align=right | 3.2 km || 
|-id=282 bgcolor=#d6d6d6
| 341282 ||  || — || September 14, 2007 || Mount Lemmon || Mount Lemmon Survey || HYG || align=right | 3.1 km || 
|-id=283 bgcolor=#d6d6d6
| 341283 ||  || — || September 14, 2007 || Mount Lemmon || Mount Lemmon Survey || — || align=right | 3.3 km || 
|-id=284 bgcolor=#d6d6d6
| 341284 ||  || — || September 10, 2007 || Mount Lemmon || Mount Lemmon Survey || — || align=right | 3.2 km || 
|-id=285 bgcolor=#d6d6d6
| 341285 ||  || — || September 12, 2007 || Mount Lemmon || Mount Lemmon Survey || — || align=right | 2.8 km || 
|-id=286 bgcolor=#d6d6d6
| 341286 ||  || — || September 13, 2007 || Mount Lemmon || Mount Lemmon Survey || — || align=right | 2.9 km || 
|-id=287 bgcolor=#E9E9E9
| 341287 ||  || — || September 13, 2007 || Mount Lemmon || Mount Lemmon Survey || AGN || align=right | 1.6 km || 
|-id=288 bgcolor=#d6d6d6
| 341288 ||  || — || September 13, 2007 || Kitt Peak || Spacewatch || — || align=right | 2.9 km || 
|-id=289 bgcolor=#d6d6d6
| 341289 ||  || — || September 13, 2007 || Kitt Peak || Spacewatch || — || align=right | 2.6 km || 
|-id=290 bgcolor=#d6d6d6
| 341290 ||  || — || September 13, 2007 || Kitt Peak || Spacewatch || — || align=right | 2.4 km || 
|-id=291 bgcolor=#d6d6d6
| 341291 ||  || — || September 12, 2007 || Mount Lemmon || Mount Lemmon Survey || — || align=right | 4.2 km || 
|-id=292 bgcolor=#d6d6d6
| 341292 ||  || — || September 11, 2007 || Kitt Peak || Spacewatch || — || align=right | 2.3 km || 
|-id=293 bgcolor=#d6d6d6
| 341293 ||  || — || September 14, 2007 || Mount Lemmon || Mount Lemmon Survey || — || align=right | 3.6 km || 
|-id=294 bgcolor=#d6d6d6
| 341294 ||  || — || September 11, 2007 || Mount Lemmon || Mount Lemmon Survey || KOR || align=right | 1.4 km || 
|-id=295 bgcolor=#E9E9E9
| 341295 ||  || — || September 5, 2007 || Catalina || CSS || GEF || align=right | 1.5 km || 
|-id=296 bgcolor=#d6d6d6
| 341296 ||  || — || September 9, 2007 || Mount Lemmon || Mount Lemmon Survey || — || align=right | 2.6 km || 
|-id=297 bgcolor=#d6d6d6
| 341297 ||  || — || September 10, 2007 || Kitt Peak || Spacewatch || — || align=right | 2.7 km || 
|-id=298 bgcolor=#d6d6d6
| 341298 ||  || — || September 10, 2007 || Mount Lemmon || Mount Lemmon Survey || KAR || align=right | 1.3 km || 
|-id=299 bgcolor=#d6d6d6
| 341299 ||  || — || September 10, 2007 || Mount Lemmon || Mount Lemmon Survey || — || align=right | 3.0 km || 
|-id=300 bgcolor=#E9E9E9
| 341300 ||  || — || September 10, 2007 || Catalina || CSS || — || align=right | 2.8 km || 
|}

341301–341400 

|-bgcolor=#d6d6d6
| 341301 ||  || — || September 13, 2007 || Catalina || CSS || HYG || align=right | 5.4 km || 
|-id=302 bgcolor=#d6d6d6
| 341302 ||  || — || September 10, 2007 || Mount Lemmon || Mount Lemmon Survey || KOR || align=right | 1.3 km || 
|-id=303 bgcolor=#d6d6d6
| 341303 ||  || — || September 15, 2007 || Mount Lemmon || Mount Lemmon Survey || KOR || align=right | 1.6 km || 
|-id=304 bgcolor=#d6d6d6
| 341304 ||  || — || September 14, 2007 || Kitt Peak || Spacewatch || K-2 || align=right | 1.7 km || 
|-id=305 bgcolor=#d6d6d6
| 341305 ||  || — || September 15, 2007 || Mount Lemmon || Mount Lemmon Survey || EOS || align=right | 2.3 km || 
|-id=306 bgcolor=#d6d6d6
| 341306 ||  || — || September 10, 2007 || Mount Lemmon || Mount Lemmon Survey || — || align=right | 3.1 km || 
|-id=307 bgcolor=#d6d6d6
| 341307 ||  || — || September 13, 2007 || Mount Lemmon || Mount Lemmon Survey || KOR || align=right | 1.4 km || 
|-id=308 bgcolor=#fefefe
| 341308 ||  || — || September 18, 2007 || Goodricke-Pigott || R. A. Tucker || H || align=right | 1.2 km || 
|-id=309 bgcolor=#d6d6d6
| 341309 ||  || — || September 16, 2007 || Socorro || LINEAR || — || align=right | 3.5 km || 
|-id=310 bgcolor=#d6d6d6
| 341310 ||  || — || September 18, 2007 || Kitt Peak || Spacewatch || KOR || align=right | 2.2 km || 
|-id=311 bgcolor=#fefefe
| 341311 ||  || — || September 25, 2007 || Mount Lemmon || Mount Lemmon Survey || H || align=right data-sort-value="0.87" | 870 m || 
|-id=312 bgcolor=#d6d6d6
| 341312 ||  || — || September 24, 2007 || Kitt Peak || Spacewatch || — || align=right | 2.2 km || 
|-id=313 bgcolor=#d6d6d6
| 341313 ||  || — || September 26, 2007 || Mount Lemmon || Mount Lemmon Survey || — || align=right | 4.0 km || 
|-id=314 bgcolor=#d6d6d6
| 341314 ||  || — || September 19, 2007 || Catalina || CSS || — || align=right | 3.5 km || 
|-id=315 bgcolor=#d6d6d6
| 341315 ||  || — || September 18, 2007 || Kitt Peak || Spacewatch || — || align=right | 3.6 km || 
|-id=316 bgcolor=#E9E9E9
| 341316 ||  || — || September 18, 2007 || Socorro || LINEAR || — || align=right | 3.2 km || 
|-id=317 bgcolor=#E9E9E9
| 341317 Weisshaidinger || 2007 TE ||  || October 1, 2007 || Gaisberg || R. Gierlinger || GEF || align=right | 1.4 km || 
|-id=318 bgcolor=#E9E9E9
| 341318 ||  || — || October 4, 2007 || Kitt Peak || Spacewatch || — || align=right | 2.4 km || 
|-id=319 bgcolor=#d6d6d6
| 341319 ||  || — || October 6, 2007 || 7300 Observatory || W. K. Y. Yeung || — || align=right | 2.5 km || 
|-id=320 bgcolor=#d6d6d6
| 341320 ||  || — || October 6, 2007 || 7300 || W. K. Y. Yeung || — || align=right | 2.5 km || 
|-id=321 bgcolor=#E9E9E9
| 341321 ||  || — || October 7, 2007 || Altschwendt || W. Ries || — || align=right | 2.4 km || 
|-id=322 bgcolor=#d6d6d6
| 341322 ||  || — || October 7, 2007 || Altschwendt || W. Ries || KOR || align=right | 1.7 km || 
|-id=323 bgcolor=#fefefe
| 341323 ||  || — || October 8, 2007 || Socorro || LINEAR || H || align=right data-sort-value="0.64" | 640 m || 
|-id=324 bgcolor=#d6d6d6
| 341324 ||  || — || October 7, 2007 || Calvin-Rehoboth || Calvin–Rehoboth Obs. || — || align=right | 3.2 km || 
|-id=325 bgcolor=#d6d6d6
| 341325 ||  || — || October 8, 2007 || Socorro || LINEAR || 628 || align=right | 2.2 km || 
|-id=326 bgcolor=#d6d6d6
| 341326 ||  || — || October 6, 2007 || Bisei SG Center || BATTeRS || — || align=right | 2.8 km || 
|-id=327 bgcolor=#d6d6d6
| 341327 ||  || — || October 4, 2007 || Mount Lemmon || Mount Lemmon Survey || K-2 || align=right | 1.4 km || 
|-id=328 bgcolor=#d6d6d6
| 341328 ||  || — || October 4, 2007 || Kitt Peak || Spacewatch || — || align=right | 3.0 km || 
|-id=329 bgcolor=#d6d6d6
| 341329 ||  || — || September 12, 2007 || Mount Lemmon || Mount Lemmon Survey || — || align=right | 4.2 km || 
|-id=330 bgcolor=#d6d6d6
| 341330 ||  || — || October 6, 2007 || Kitt Peak || Spacewatch || — || align=right | 2.8 km || 
|-id=331 bgcolor=#d6d6d6
| 341331 ||  || — || October 6, 2007 || Kitt Peak || Spacewatch || — || align=right | 3.3 km || 
|-id=332 bgcolor=#d6d6d6
| 341332 ||  || — || October 6, 2007 || Kitt Peak || Spacewatch || — || align=right | 3.4 km || 
|-id=333 bgcolor=#d6d6d6
| 341333 ||  || — || October 6, 2007 || Kitt Peak || Spacewatch || — || align=right | 4.0 km || 
|-id=334 bgcolor=#d6d6d6
| 341334 ||  || — || October 7, 2007 || Mount Lemmon || Mount Lemmon Survey || — || align=right | 3.5 km || 
|-id=335 bgcolor=#d6d6d6
| 341335 ||  || — || October 9, 2007 || Kitt Peak || Spacewatch || — || align=right | 2.8 km || 
|-id=336 bgcolor=#d6d6d6
| 341336 ||  || — || October 4, 2007 || Kitt Peak || Spacewatch || — || align=right | 1.9 km || 
|-id=337 bgcolor=#d6d6d6
| 341337 ||  || — || October 4, 2007 || Catalina || CSS || — || align=right | 3.6 km || 
|-id=338 bgcolor=#d6d6d6
| 341338 ||  || — || October 6, 2007 || Kitt Peak || Spacewatch || EOS || align=right | 2.2 km || 
|-id=339 bgcolor=#d6d6d6
| 341339 ||  || — || October 6, 2007 || Kitt Peak || Spacewatch || URS || align=right | 5.9 km || 
|-id=340 bgcolor=#d6d6d6
| 341340 ||  || — || October 6, 2007 || Kitt Peak || Spacewatch || EMA || align=right | 4.1 km || 
|-id=341 bgcolor=#E9E9E9
| 341341 ||  || — || October 7, 2007 || Mount Lemmon || Mount Lemmon Survey || — || align=right | 3.1 km || 
|-id=342 bgcolor=#d6d6d6
| 341342 ||  || — || October 7, 2007 || Mount Lemmon || Mount Lemmon Survey || — || align=right | 3.4 km || 
|-id=343 bgcolor=#d6d6d6
| 341343 ||  || — || October 7, 2007 || Mount Lemmon || Mount Lemmon Survey || — || align=right | 2.6 km || 
|-id=344 bgcolor=#d6d6d6
| 341344 ||  || — || October 8, 2007 || Mount Lemmon || Mount Lemmon Survey || — || align=right | 2.4 km || 
|-id=345 bgcolor=#d6d6d6
| 341345 ||  || — || October 4, 2007 || Kitt Peak || Spacewatch || — || align=right | 3.1 km || 
|-id=346 bgcolor=#d6d6d6
| 341346 ||  || — || October 4, 2007 || Kitt Peak || Spacewatch || — || align=right | 3.1 km || 
|-id=347 bgcolor=#d6d6d6
| 341347 ||  || — || October 4, 2007 || Kitt Peak || Spacewatch || — || align=right | 3.9 km || 
|-id=348 bgcolor=#d6d6d6
| 341348 ||  || — || October 4, 2007 || Kitt Peak || Spacewatch || — || align=right | 2.6 km || 
|-id=349 bgcolor=#d6d6d6
| 341349 ||  || — || October 4, 2007 || Kitt Peak || Spacewatch || — || align=right | 3.7 km || 
|-id=350 bgcolor=#d6d6d6
| 341350 ||  || — || October 4, 2007 || Kitt Peak || Spacewatch || KAR || align=right | 1.1 km || 
|-id=351 bgcolor=#d6d6d6
| 341351 ||  || — || October 4, 2007 || Kitt Peak || Spacewatch || THM || align=right | 2.7 km || 
|-id=352 bgcolor=#d6d6d6
| 341352 ||  || — || October 5, 2007 || Kitt Peak || Spacewatch || — || align=right | 2.9 km || 
|-id=353 bgcolor=#E9E9E9
| 341353 ||  || — || October 5, 2007 || Kitt Peak || Spacewatch || AGN || align=right | 1.3 km || 
|-id=354 bgcolor=#E9E9E9
| 341354 ||  || — || October 5, 2007 || Kitt Peak || Spacewatch || — || align=right | 2.2 km || 
|-id=355 bgcolor=#d6d6d6
| 341355 ||  || — || October 5, 2007 || Kitt Peak || Spacewatch || — || align=right | 3.2 km || 
|-id=356 bgcolor=#d6d6d6
| 341356 ||  || — || October 7, 2007 || Mount Lemmon || Mount Lemmon Survey || — || align=right | 3.6 km || 
|-id=357 bgcolor=#d6d6d6
| 341357 ||  || — || October 7, 2007 || Mount Lemmon || Mount Lemmon Survey || — || align=right | 2.6 km || 
|-id=358 bgcolor=#d6d6d6
| 341358 ||  || — || October 11, 2007 || La Sagra || OAM Obs. || — || align=right | 4.1 km || 
|-id=359 bgcolor=#d6d6d6
| 341359 Gregneumann ||  ||  || October 14, 2007 || CBA-NOVAC || D. R. Skillman || EOS || align=right | 1.9 km || 
|-id=360 bgcolor=#d6d6d6
| 341360 ||  || — || October 13, 2007 || Calvin-Rehoboth || Calvin–Rehoboth Obs. || EOS || align=right | 2.2 km || 
|-id=361 bgcolor=#E9E9E9
| 341361 ||  || — || October 7, 2007 || Antares || ARO || AGN || align=right | 1.3 km || 
|-id=362 bgcolor=#d6d6d6
| 341362 ||  || — || October 5, 2007 || Kitt Peak || Spacewatch || — || align=right | 3.8 km || 
|-id=363 bgcolor=#d6d6d6
| 341363 ||  || — || October 8, 2007 || Kitt Peak || Spacewatch || — || align=right | 3.8 km || 
|-id=364 bgcolor=#d6d6d6
| 341364 ||  || — || October 8, 2007 || Mount Lemmon || Mount Lemmon Survey || — || align=right | 2.4 km || 
|-id=365 bgcolor=#d6d6d6
| 341365 ||  || — || October 8, 2007 || Mount Lemmon || Mount Lemmon Survey || KOR || align=right | 1.5 km || 
|-id=366 bgcolor=#d6d6d6
| 341366 ||  || — || October 6, 2007 || Kitt Peak || Spacewatch || — || align=right | 3.7 km || 
|-id=367 bgcolor=#d6d6d6
| 341367 ||  || — || September 12, 2007 || Mount Lemmon || Mount Lemmon Survey || ALA || align=right | 3.3 km || 
|-id=368 bgcolor=#d6d6d6
| 341368 ||  || — || October 7, 2007 || Catalina || CSS || — || align=right | 4.6 km || 
|-id=369 bgcolor=#d6d6d6
| 341369 ||  || — || October 7, 2007 || Kitt Peak || Spacewatch || — || align=right | 3.7 km || 
|-id=370 bgcolor=#d6d6d6
| 341370 ||  || — || October 8, 2007 || Mount Lemmon || Mount Lemmon Survey || — || align=right | 2.3 km || 
|-id=371 bgcolor=#d6d6d6
| 341371 ||  || — || October 8, 2007 || Mount Lemmon || Mount Lemmon Survey || — || align=right | 3.6 km || 
|-id=372 bgcolor=#d6d6d6
| 341372 ||  || — || October 4, 2007 || Kitt Peak || Spacewatch || — || align=right | 1.9 km || 
|-id=373 bgcolor=#d6d6d6
| 341373 ||  || — || September 13, 2007 || Mount Lemmon || Mount Lemmon Survey || — || align=right | 2.5 km || 
|-id=374 bgcolor=#E9E9E9
| 341374 ||  || — || October 6, 2007 || La Cañada || J. Lacruz || — || align=right | 2.0 km || 
|-id=375 bgcolor=#d6d6d6
| 341375 ||  || — || October 7, 2007 || Catalina || CSS || — || align=right | 3.6 km || 
|-id=376 bgcolor=#d6d6d6
| 341376 ||  || — || October 8, 2007 || Catalina || CSS || NAE || align=right | 4.2 km || 
|-id=377 bgcolor=#d6d6d6
| 341377 ||  || — || October 8, 2007 || Mount Lemmon || Mount Lemmon Survey || — || align=right | 4.3 km || 
|-id=378 bgcolor=#d6d6d6
| 341378 ||  || — || October 9, 2007 || Kitt Peak || Spacewatch || EOS || align=right | 2.6 km || 
|-id=379 bgcolor=#d6d6d6
| 341379 ||  || — || October 4, 2007 || Kitt Peak || Spacewatch || — || align=right | 2.7 km || 
|-id=380 bgcolor=#d6d6d6
| 341380 ||  || — || October 5, 2007 || Kitt Peak || Spacewatch || 628 || align=right | 2.1 km || 
|-id=381 bgcolor=#d6d6d6
| 341381 ||  || — || October 5, 2007 || Kitt Peak || Spacewatch || — || align=right | 3.3 km || 
|-id=382 bgcolor=#d6d6d6
| 341382 ||  || — || October 6, 2007 || Kitt Peak || Spacewatch || THM || align=right | 3.0 km || 
|-id=383 bgcolor=#d6d6d6
| 341383 ||  || — || October 6, 2007 || Kitt Peak || Spacewatch || — || align=right | 2.9 km || 
|-id=384 bgcolor=#d6d6d6
| 341384 ||  || — || October 6, 2007 || Kitt Peak || Spacewatch || — || align=right | 3.1 km || 
|-id=385 bgcolor=#d6d6d6
| 341385 ||  || — || October 6, 2007 || Kitt Peak || Spacewatch || — || align=right | 2.7 km || 
|-id=386 bgcolor=#d6d6d6
| 341386 ||  || — || October 6, 2007 || Kitt Peak || Spacewatch || — || align=right | 4.1 km || 
|-id=387 bgcolor=#d6d6d6
| 341387 ||  || — || October 6, 2007 || Kitt Peak || Spacewatch || EOS || align=right | 2.5 km || 
|-id=388 bgcolor=#d6d6d6
| 341388 ||  || — || October 6, 2007 || Kitt Peak || Spacewatch || — || align=right | 2.2 km || 
|-id=389 bgcolor=#d6d6d6
| 341389 ||  || — || October 6, 2007 || Kitt Peak || Spacewatch || — || align=right | 3.0 km || 
|-id=390 bgcolor=#d6d6d6
| 341390 ||  || — || October 7, 2007 || Kitt Peak || Spacewatch || — || align=right | 3.9 km || 
|-id=391 bgcolor=#d6d6d6
| 341391 ||  || — || October 7, 2007 || Mount Lemmon || Mount Lemmon Survey || THM || align=right | 2.1 km || 
|-id=392 bgcolor=#d6d6d6
| 341392 ||  || — || October 7, 2007 || Mount Lemmon || Mount Lemmon Survey || HYG || align=right | 3.1 km || 
|-id=393 bgcolor=#d6d6d6
| 341393 ||  || — || October 8, 2007 || Catalina || CSS || — || align=right | 4.5 km || 
|-id=394 bgcolor=#E9E9E9
| 341394 ||  || — || October 9, 2007 || Catalina || CSS || — || align=right | 2.7 km || 
|-id=395 bgcolor=#d6d6d6
| 341395 ||  || — || October 9, 2007 || Catalina || CSS || TIR || align=right | 4.1 km || 
|-id=396 bgcolor=#d6d6d6
| 341396 ||  || — || October 9, 2007 || Mount Lemmon || Mount Lemmon Survey || — || align=right | 4.0 km || 
|-id=397 bgcolor=#E9E9E9
| 341397 ||  || — || October 6, 2007 || Socorro || LINEAR || HOF || align=right | 3.6 km || 
|-id=398 bgcolor=#d6d6d6
| 341398 ||  || — || October 9, 2007 || Socorro || LINEAR || — || align=right | 3.2 km || 
|-id=399 bgcolor=#d6d6d6
| 341399 ||  || — || October 9, 2007 || Socorro || LINEAR || — || align=right | 3.5 km || 
|-id=400 bgcolor=#d6d6d6
| 341400 ||  || — || October 9, 2007 || Socorro || LINEAR || — || align=right | 3.8 km || 
|}

341401–341500 

|-bgcolor=#d6d6d6
| 341401 ||  || — || October 9, 2007 || Socorro || LINEAR || — || align=right | 3.8 km || 
|-id=402 bgcolor=#d6d6d6
| 341402 ||  || — || October 11, 2007 || Socorro || LINEAR || — || align=right | 4.1 km || 
|-id=403 bgcolor=#d6d6d6
| 341403 ||  || — || October 11, 2007 || Socorro || LINEAR || — || align=right | 3.2 km || 
|-id=404 bgcolor=#d6d6d6
| 341404 ||  || — || May 1, 2006 || Catalina || CSS || — || align=right | 3.4 km || 
|-id=405 bgcolor=#d6d6d6
| 341405 ||  || — || October 11, 2007 || Socorro || LINEAR || KOR || align=right | 1.8 km || 
|-id=406 bgcolor=#d6d6d6
| 341406 ||  || — || October 12, 2007 || Socorro || LINEAR || — || align=right | 4.8 km || 
|-id=407 bgcolor=#d6d6d6
| 341407 ||  || — || October 12, 2007 || Socorro || LINEAR || EOS || align=right | 2.6 km || 
|-id=408 bgcolor=#d6d6d6
| 341408 ||  || — || October 12, 2007 || Socorro || LINEAR || — || align=right | 3.5 km || 
|-id=409 bgcolor=#d6d6d6
| 341409 ||  || — || October 12, 2007 || Socorro || LINEAR || — || align=right | 3.8 km || 
|-id=410 bgcolor=#d6d6d6
| 341410 ||  || — || October 4, 2007 || Kitt Peak || Spacewatch || KOR || align=right | 1.5 km || 
|-id=411 bgcolor=#d6d6d6
| 341411 ||  || — || October 4, 2007 || Kitt Peak || Spacewatch || — || align=right | 4.7 km || 
|-id=412 bgcolor=#d6d6d6
| 341412 ||  || — || October 8, 2007 || Anderson Mesa || LONEOS || TIR || align=right | 4.3 km || 
|-id=413 bgcolor=#d6d6d6
| 341413 ||  || — || October 13, 2007 || Gaisberg || R. Gierlinger || — || align=right | 3.4 km || 
|-id=414 bgcolor=#d6d6d6
| 341414 ||  || — || October 13, 2007 || Socorro || LINEAR || 628 || align=right | 2.5 km || 
|-id=415 bgcolor=#d6d6d6
| 341415 ||  || — || October 8, 2007 || Anderson Mesa || LONEOS || — || align=right | 3.1 km || 
|-id=416 bgcolor=#E9E9E9
| 341416 ||  || — || September 10, 2007 || Mount Lemmon || Mount Lemmon Survey || — || align=right | 1.8 km || 
|-id=417 bgcolor=#d6d6d6
| 341417 ||  || — || October 7, 2007 || Mount Lemmon || Mount Lemmon Survey || — || align=right | 2.6 km || 
|-id=418 bgcolor=#d6d6d6
| 341418 ||  || — || October 8, 2007 || Kitt Peak || Spacewatch || — || align=right | 2.4 km || 
|-id=419 bgcolor=#d6d6d6
| 341419 ||  || — || May 16, 2005 || Mount Lemmon || Mount Lemmon Survey || — || align=right | 3.0 km || 
|-id=420 bgcolor=#d6d6d6
| 341420 ||  || — || October 8, 2007 || Kitt Peak || Spacewatch || — || align=right | 2.1 km || 
|-id=421 bgcolor=#d6d6d6
| 341421 ||  || — || October 8, 2007 || Mount Lemmon || Mount Lemmon Survey || — || align=right | 2.9 km || 
|-id=422 bgcolor=#d6d6d6
| 341422 ||  || — || October 8, 2007 || Mount Lemmon || Mount Lemmon Survey || EOS || align=right | 2.7 km || 
|-id=423 bgcolor=#d6d6d6
| 341423 ||  || — || September 10, 2007 || Mount Lemmon || Mount Lemmon Survey || MEL || align=right | 3.6 km || 
|-id=424 bgcolor=#d6d6d6
| 341424 ||  || — || October 8, 2007 || Mount Lemmon || Mount Lemmon Survey || — || align=right | 3.0 km || 
|-id=425 bgcolor=#d6d6d6
| 341425 ||  || — || October 8, 2007 || Mount Lemmon || Mount Lemmon Survey || — || align=right | 2.8 km || 
|-id=426 bgcolor=#d6d6d6
| 341426 ||  || — || October 9, 2007 || Anderson Mesa || LONEOS || URS || align=right | 4.2 km || 
|-id=427 bgcolor=#d6d6d6
| 341427 ||  || — || October 7, 2007 || Kitt Peak || Spacewatch || HYG || align=right | 5.7 km || 
|-id=428 bgcolor=#d6d6d6
| 341428 ||  || — || October 7, 2007 || Kitt Peak || Spacewatch || EOS || align=right | 2.8 km || 
|-id=429 bgcolor=#d6d6d6
| 341429 ||  || — || October 9, 2007 || Kitt Peak || Spacewatch || — || align=right | 3.3 km || 
|-id=430 bgcolor=#d6d6d6
| 341430 ||  || — || October 10, 2007 || Kitt Peak || Spacewatch || — || align=right | 2.7 km || 
|-id=431 bgcolor=#d6d6d6
| 341431 ||  || — || October 8, 2007 || Kitt Peak || Spacewatch || — || align=right | 3.6 km || 
|-id=432 bgcolor=#d6d6d6
| 341432 ||  || — || October 8, 2007 || Catalina || CSS || EOS || align=right | 2.3 km || 
|-id=433 bgcolor=#d6d6d6
| 341433 ||  || — || October 8, 2007 || Kitt Peak || Spacewatch || — || align=right | 2.6 km || 
|-id=434 bgcolor=#d6d6d6
| 341434 ||  || — || October 8, 2007 || Kitt Peak || Spacewatch || — || align=right | 2.4 km || 
|-id=435 bgcolor=#d6d6d6
| 341435 ||  || — || October 8, 2007 || Kitt Peak || Spacewatch || VER || align=right | 3.1 km || 
|-id=436 bgcolor=#d6d6d6
| 341436 ||  || — || October 8, 2007 || Kitt Peak || Spacewatch || — || align=right | 3.2 km || 
|-id=437 bgcolor=#d6d6d6
| 341437 ||  || — || September 14, 2007 || Mount Lemmon || Mount Lemmon Survey || HYG || align=right | 2.8 km || 
|-id=438 bgcolor=#d6d6d6
| 341438 ||  || — || October 9, 2007 || Mount Lemmon || Mount Lemmon Survey || URS || align=right | 3.1 km || 
|-id=439 bgcolor=#d6d6d6
| 341439 ||  || — || October 10, 2007 || Mount Lemmon || Mount Lemmon Survey || — || align=right | 2.6 km || 
|-id=440 bgcolor=#d6d6d6
| 341440 ||  || — || October 14, 2007 || Socorro || LINEAR || EOS || align=right | 2.6 km || 
|-id=441 bgcolor=#d6d6d6
| 341441 ||  || — || October 8, 2007 || Catalina || CSS || — || align=right | 3.3 km || 
|-id=442 bgcolor=#d6d6d6
| 341442 ||  || — || October 8, 2007 || Catalina || CSS || — || align=right | 3.9 km || 
|-id=443 bgcolor=#d6d6d6
| 341443 ||  || — || October 9, 2007 || Catalina || CSS || — || align=right | 5.6 km || 
|-id=444 bgcolor=#d6d6d6
| 341444 ||  || — || October 11, 2007 || Mount Lemmon || Mount Lemmon Survey || — || align=right | 4.5 km || 
|-id=445 bgcolor=#d6d6d6
| 341445 ||  || — || October 8, 2007 || Mount Lemmon || Mount Lemmon Survey || MRC || align=right | 3.2 km || 
|-id=446 bgcolor=#d6d6d6
| 341446 ||  || — || October 10, 2007 || Kitt Peak || Spacewatch || EOS || align=right | 2.9 km || 
|-id=447 bgcolor=#d6d6d6
| 341447 ||  || — || October 10, 2007 || Kitt Peak || Spacewatch || — || align=right | 2.4 km || 
|-id=448 bgcolor=#d6d6d6
| 341448 ||  || — || October 11, 2007 || Kitt Peak || Spacewatch || CHA || align=right | 2.5 km || 
|-id=449 bgcolor=#d6d6d6
| 341449 ||  || — || October 9, 2007 || Kitt Peak || Spacewatch || EOS || align=right | 2.2 km || 
|-id=450 bgcolor=#d6d6d6
| 341450 ||  || — || October 9, 2007 || Kitt Peak || Spacewatch || — || align=right | 2.8 km || 
|-id=451 bgcolor=#d6d6d6
| 341451 ||  || — || October 9, 2007 || Kitt Peak || Spacewatch || — || align=right | 2.2 km || 
|-id=452 bgcolor=#d6d6d6
| 341452 ||  || — || October 9, 2007 || Kitt Peak || Spacewatch || EOS || align=right | 2.3 km || 
|-id=453 bgcolor=#d6d6d6
| 341453 ||  || — || October 9, 2007 || Kitt Peak || Spacewatch || KOR || align=right | 1.4 km || 
|-id=454 bgcolor=#d6d6d6
| 341454 ||  || — || September 12, 2007 || Catalina || CSS || — || align=right | 3.3 km || 
|-id=455 bgcolor=#d6d6d6
| 341455 ||  || — || October 12, 2007 || Kitt Peak || Spacewatch || — || align=right | 2.5 km || 
|-id=456 bgcolor=#d6d6d6
| 341456 ||  || — || October 12, 2007 || Kitt Peak || Spacewatch || — || align=right | 3.0 km || 
|-id=457 bgcolor=#d6d6d6
| 341457 ||  || — || October 12, 2007 || Mount Lemmon || Mount Lemmon Survey || — || align=right | 3.2 km || 
|-id=458 bgcolor=#E9E9E9
| 341458 ||  || — || October 13, 2007 || Mount Lemmon || Mount Lemmon Survey || — || align=right | 2.8 km || 
|-id=459 bgcolor=#d6d6d6
| 341459 ||  || — || October 9, 2007 || Kitt Peak || Spacewatch || — || align=right | 3.2 km || 
|-id=460 bgcolor=#d6d6d6
| 341460 ||  || — || October 9, 2007 || Mount Lemmon || Mount Lemmon Survey || — || align=right | 2.4 km || 
|-id=461 bgcolor=#d6d6d6
| 341461 ||  || — || October 11, 2007 || Mount Lemmon || Mount Lemmon Survey || — || align=right | 2.9 km || 
|-id=462 bgcolor=#E9E9E9
| 341462 ||  || — || October 11, 2007 || Mount Lemmon || Mount Lemmon Survey || — || align=right | 2.8 km || 
|-id=463 bgcolor=#d6d6d6
| 341463 ||  || — || October 12, 2007 || Kitt Peak || Spacewatch || — || align=right | 2.4 km || 
|-id=464 bgcolor=#d6d6d6
| 341464 ||  || — || October 12, 2007 || Kitt Peak || Spacewatch || — || align=right | 2.8 km || 
|-id=465 bgcolor=#d6d6d6
| 341465 ||  || — || October 12, 2007 || Kitt Peak || Spacewatch || THM || align=right | 1.9 km || 
|-id=466 bgcolor=#d6d6d6
| 341466 ||  || — || October 12, 2007 || Kitt Peak || Spacewatch || — || align=right | 3.6 km || 
|-id=467 bgcolor=#d6d6d6
| 341467 ||  || — || October 12, 2007 || Kitt Peak || Spacewatch || — || align=right | 3.5 km || 
|-id=468 bgcolor=#d6d6d6
| 341468 ||  || — || October 12, 2007 || Kitt Peak || Spacewatch || — || align=right | 3.9 km || 
|-id=469 bgcolor=#d6d6d6
| 341469 ||  || — || October 12, 2007 || Kitt Peak || Spacewatch || — || align=right | 2.9 km || 
|-id=470 bgcolor=#d6d6d6
| 341470 ||  || — || October 11, 2007 || Kitt Peak || Spacewatch || — || align=right | 3.3 km || 
|-id=471 bgcolor=#d6d6d6
| 341471 ||  || — || October 11, 2007 || Kitt Peak || Spacewatch || — || align=right | 2.8 km || 
|-id=472 bgcolor=#d6d6d6
| 341472 ||  || — || October 11, 2007 || Kitt Peak || Spacewatch || HYG || align=right | 3.4 km || 
|-id=473 bgcolor=#d6d6d6
| 341473 ||  || — || October 11, 2007 || Kitt Peak || Spacewatch || — || align=right | 3.6 km || 
|-id=474 bgcolor=#d6d6d6
| 341474 ||  || — || October 10, 2007 || Mount Lemmon || Mount Lemmon Survey || — || align=right | 3.1 km || 
|-id=475 bgcolor=#d6d6d6
| 341475 ||  || — || October 8, 2007 || Mount Lemmon || Mount Lemmon Survey || — || align=right | 2.6 km || 
|-id=476 bgcolor=#d6d6d6
| 341476 ||  || — || October 10, 2007 || Catalina || CSS || — || align=right | 3.9 km || 
|-id=477 bgcolor=#d6d6d6
| 341477 ||  || — || October 14, 2007 || Mount Lemmon || Mount Lemmon Survey || — || align=right | 4.1 km || 
|-id=478 bgcolor=#d6d6d6
| 341478 ||  || — || October 14, 2007 || Mount Lemmon || Mount Lemmon Survey || — || align=right | 3.0 km || 
|-id=479 bgcolor=#d6d6d6
| 341479 ||  || — || October 14, 2007 || Mount Lemmon || Mount Lemmon Survey || THM || align=right | 2.3 km || 
|-id=480 bgcolor=#d6d6d6
| 341480 ||  || — || October 14, 2007 || Mount Lemmon || Mount Lemmon Survey || — || align=right | 3.4 km || 
|-id=481 bgcolor=#d6d6d6
| 341481 ||  || — || October 14, 2007 || Mount Lemmon || Mount Lemmon Survey || — || align=right | 4.5 km || 
|-id=482 bgcolor=#d6d6d6
| 341482 ||  || — || October 14, 2007 || Mount Lemmon || Mount Lemmon Survey || — || align=right | 3.9 km || 
|-id=483 bgcolor=#d6d6d6
| 341483 ||  || — || October 15, 2007 || Catalina || CSS || — || align=right | 3.6 km || 
|-id=484 bgcolor=#d6d6d6
| 341484 ||  || — || October 9, 2007 || Mount Lemmon || Mount Lemmon Survey || KOR || align=right | 1.5 km || 
|-id=485 bgcolor=#d6d6d6
| 341485 ||  || — || October 9, 2007 || Mount Lemmon || Mount Lemmon Survey || — || align=right | 2.3 km || 
|-id=486 bgcolor=#d6d6d6
| 341486 ||  || — || October 10, 2007 || Mount Lemmon || Mount Lemmon Survey || — || align=right | 4.3 km || 
|-id=487 bgcolor=#d6d6d6
| 341487 ||  || — || October 12, 2007 || Mount Lemmon || Mount Lemmon Survey || — || align=right | 5.3 km || 
|-id=488 bgcolor=#d6d6d6
| 341488 ||  || — || October 15, 2007 || Mount Lemmon || Mount Lemmon Survey || CHA || align=right | 1.8 km || 
|-id=489 bgcolor=#d6d6d6
| 341489 ||  || — || October 13, 2007 || Catalina || CSS || KOR || align=right | 1.5 km || 
|-id=490 bgcolor=#d6d6d6
| 341490 ||  || — || October 14, 2007 || Kitt Peak || Spacewatch || EOS || align=right | 2.6 km || 
|-id=491 bgcolor=#d6d6d6
| 341491 ||  || — || October 14, 2007 || Kitt Peak || Spacewatch || CHA || align=right | 3.2 km || 
|-id=492 bgcolor=#d6d6d6
| 341492 ||  || — || October 14, 2007 || Kitt Peak || Spacewatch || KOR || align=right | 1.3 km || 
|-id=493 bgcolor=#d6d6d6
| 341493 ||  || — || October 14, 2007 || Kitt Peak || Spacewatch || HYG || align=right | 3.9 km || 
|-id=494 bgcolor=#d6d6d6
| 341494 ||  || — || October 14, 2007 || Mount Lemmon || Mount Lemmon Survey || — || align=right | 3.8 km || 
|-id=495 bgcolor=#E9E9E9
| 341495 ||  || — || October 13, 2007 || Mount Lemmon || Mount Lemmon Survey || WIT || align=right | 1.3 km || 
|-id=496 bgcolor=#d6d6d6
| 341496 ||  || — || October 8, 2007 || Mount Lemmon || Mount Lemmon Survey || — || align=right | 4.0 km || 
|-id=497 bgcolor=#d6d6d6
| 341497 ||  || — || October 15, 2007 || Catalina || CSS || — || align=right | 3.4 km || 
|-id=498 bgcolor=#E9E9E9
| 341498 ||  || — || October 13, 2007 || Kitt Peak || Spacewatch || — || align=right | 2.5 km || 
|-id=499 bgcolor=#d6d6d6
| 341499 ||  || — || October 15, 2007 || Kitt Peak || Spacewatch || — || align=right | 2.8 km || 
|-id=500 bgcolor=#d6d6d6
| 341500 ||  || — || October 15, 2007 || Catalina || CSS || — || align=right | 3.2 km || 
|}

341501–341600 

|-bgcolor=#d6d6d6
| 341501 ||  || — || October 15, 2007 || Kitt Peak || Spacewatch || — || align=right | 3.9 km || 
|-id=502 bgcolor=#d6d6d6
| 341502 ||  || — || October 15, 2007 || Kitt Peak || Spacewatch || EOS || align=right | 2.1 km || 
|-id=503 bgcolor=#d6d6d6
| 341503 ||  || — || October 15, 2007 || Kitt Peak || Spacewatch || — || align=right | 3.3 km || 
|-id=504 bgcolor=#d6d6d6
| 341504 ||  || — || October 15, 2007 || Kitt Peak || Spacewatch || — || align=right | 2.6 km || 
|-id=505 bgcolor=#d6d6d6
| 341505 ||  || — || October 15, 2007 || Kitt Peak || Spacewatch || — || align=right | 3.4 km || 
|-id=506 bgcolor=#d6d6d6
| 341506 ||  || — || October 15, 2007 || Mount Lemmon || Mount Lemmon Survey || — || align=right | 5.3 km || 
|-id=507 bgcolor=#fefefe
| 341507 ||  || — || October 15, 2007 || Kitt Peak || Spacewatch || H || align=right data-sort-value="0.67" | 670 m || 
|-id=508 bgcolor=#d6d6d6
| 341508 ||  || — || October 15, 2007 || Kitt Peak || Spacewatch || — || align=right | 2.1 km || 
|-id=509 bgcolor=#d6d6d6
| 341509 ||  || — || October 15, 2007 || Catalina || CSS || — || align=right | 3.0 km || 
|-id=510 bgcolor=#d6d6d6
| 341510 ||  || — || October 7, 2007 || Catalina || CSS || — || align=right | 3.8 km || 
|-id=511 bgcolor=#d6d6d6
| 341511 ||  || — || October 8, 2007 || Kitt Peak || Spacewatch || — || align=right | 2.5 km || 
|-id=512 bgcolor=#d6d6d6
| 341512 ||  || — || October 10, 2007 || Catalina || CSS || — || align=right | 4.1 km || 
|-id=513 bgcolor=#d6d6d6
| 341513 ||  || — || October 9, 2007 || Catalina || CSS || — || align=right | 5.3 km || 
|-id=514 bgcolor=#d6d6d6
| 341514 ||  || — || October 11, 2007 || Catalina || CSS || — || align=right | 3.9 km || 
|-id=515 bgcolor=#d6d6d6
| 341515 ||  || — || October 8, 2007 || Kitt Peak || Spacewatch || — || align=right | 2.5 km || 
|-id=516 bgcolor=#d6d6d6
| 341516 ||  || — || October 9, 2007 || Kitt Peak || Spacewatch || EOS || align=right | 2.2 km || 
|-id=517 bgcolor=#d6d6d6
| 341517 ||  || — || October 10, 2007 || Catalina || CSS || — || align=right | 4.0 km || 
|-id=518 bgcolor=#d6d6d6
| 341518 ||  || — || October 10, 2007 || Catalina || CSS || — || align=right | 3.6 km || 
|-id=519 bgcolor=#d6d6d6
| 341519 ||  || — || October 12, 2007 || Kitt Peak || Spacewatch || — || align=right | 2.9 km || 
|-id=520 bgcolor=#C2E0FF
| 341520 Mors-Somnus ||  ||  || October 14, 2007 || Mauna Kea || S. S. Sheppard, C. Trujillo || plutinomoon || align=right | 189 km || 
|-id=521 bgcolor=#d6d6d6
| 341521 ||  || — || October 4, 2007 || Kitt Peak || Spacewatch || — || align=right | 2.5 km || 
|-id=522 bgcolor=#d6d6d6
| 341522 ||  || — || October 4, 2007 || Kitt Peak || Spacewatch || — || align=right | 2.8 km || 
|-id=523 bgcolor=#d6d6d6
| 341523 ||  || — || October 7, 2007 || Mount Lemmon || Mount Lemmon Survey || — || align=right | 4.3 km || 
|-id=524 bgcolor=#d6d6d6
| 341524 ||  || — || October 9, 2007 || Kitt Peak || Spacewatch || — || align=right | 3.6 km || 
|-id=525 bgcolor=#d6d6d6
| 341525 ||  || — || October 14, 2007 || Kitt Peak || Spacewatch || — || align=right | 2.9 km || 
|-id=526 bgcolor=#d6d6d6
| 341526 ||  || — || October 8, 2007 || Catalina || CSS || — || align=right | 3.9 km || 
|-id=527 bgcolor=#d6d6d6
| 341527 ||  || — || October 12, 2007 || Catalina || CSS || — || align=right | 3.2 km || 
|-id=528 bgcolor=#d6d6d6
| 341528 ||  || — || October 7, 2007 || Catalina || CSS || EOS || align=right | 4.4 km || 
|-id=529 bgcolor=#d6d6d6
| 341529 ||  || — || October 9, 2007 || Catalina || CSS || — || align=right | 4.4 km || 
|-id=530 bgcolor=#d6d6d6
| 341530 ||  || — || October 11, 2007 || Catalina || CSS || — || align=right | 3.0 km || 
|-id=531 bgcolor=#d6d6d6
| 341531 ||  || — || October 9, 2007 || Socorro || LINEAR || — || align=right | 3.6 km || 
|-id=532 bgcolor=#d6d6d6
| 341532 ||  || — || October 6, 1996 || Kitt Peak || Spacewatch || — || align=right | 3.5 km || 
|-id=533 bgcolor=#d6d6d6
| 341533 ||  || — || October 16, 2002 || Needville || Needville Obs. || — || align=right | 2.6 km || 
|-id=534 bgcolor=#d6d6d6
| 341534 ||  || — || October 11, 2007 || Kitt Peak || Spacewatch || — || align=right | 3.2 km || 
|-id=535 bgcolor=#d6d6d6
| 341535 ||  || — || October 6, 2007 || Socorro || LINEAR || — || align=right | 2.8 km || 
|-id=536 bgcolor=#d6d6d6
| 341536 ||  || — || October 7, 2007 || Kitt Peak || Spacewatch || — || align=right | 3.4 km || 
|-id=537 bgcolor=#d6d6d6
| 341537 ||  || — || October 9, 2007 || Kitt Peak || Spacewatch || — || align=right | 2.6 km || 
|-id=538 bgcolor=#d6d6d6
| 341538 ||  || — || October 10, 2007 || Catalina || CSS || TEL || align=right | 2.0 km || 
|-id=539 bgcolor=#d6d6d6
| 341539 ||  || — || October 9, 2007 || Mount Lemmon || Mount Lemmon Survey || — || align=right | 4.4 km || 
|-id=540 bgcolor=#d6d6d6
| 341540 ||  || — || October 14, 2007 || Kitt Peak || Spacewatch || — || align=right | 3.5 km || 
|-id=541 bgcolor=#d6d6d6
| 341541 ||  || — || October 7, 2007 || Kitt Peak || Spacewatch || — || align=right | 2.6 km || 
|-id=542 bgcolor=#d6d6d6
| 341542 ||  || — || October 9, 2007 || Catalina || CSS || — || align=right | 3.7 km || 
|-id=543 bgcolor=#d6d6d6
| 341543 ||  || — || October 14, 2007 || Mount Lemmon || Mount Lemmon Survey || — || align=right | 3.5 km || 
|-id=544 bgcolor=#d6d6d6
| 341544 ||  || — || October 16, 2007 || Bisei SG Center || BATTeRS || — || align=right | 2.7 km || 
|-id=545 bgcolor=#d6d6d6
| 341545 ||  || — || October 17, 2007 || 7300 || W. K. Y. Yeung || EOS || align=right | 2.8 km || 
|-id=546 bgcolor=#d6d6d6
| 341546 ||  || — || October 17, 2007 || 7300 || W. K. Y. Yeung || — || align=right | 2.9 km || 
|-id=547 bgcolor=#d6d6d6
| 341547 ||  || — || October 17, 2007 || Dauban || Chante-Perdrix Obs. || BRA || align=right | 2.1 km || 
|-id=548 bgcolor=#d6d6d6
| 341548 ||  || — || October 17, 2007 || Dauban || Chante-Perdrix Obs. || EOS || align=right | 2.1 km || 
|-id=549 bgcolor=#d6d6d6
| 341549 ||  || — || October 16, 2007 || Catalina || CSS || EOS || align=right | 2.6 km || 
|-id=550 bgcolor=#d6d6d6
| 341550 ||  || — || October 16, 2007 || Catalina || CSS || TEL || align=right | 2.3 km || 
|-id=551 bgcolor=#d6d6d6
| 341551 ||  || — || October 9, 2007 || Kitt Peak || Spacewatch || — || align=right | 2.8 km || 
|-id=552 bgcolor=#d6d6d6
| 341552 ||  || — || October 16, 2007 || Kitt Peak || Spacewatch || — || align=right | 2.5 km || 
|-id=553 bgcolor=#d6d6d6
| 341553 ||  || — || October 16, 2007 || Kitt Peak || Spacewatch || — || align=right | 2.7 km || 
|-id=554 bgcolor=#d6d6d6
| 341554 ||  || — || October 16, 2007 || Kitt Peak || Spacewatch || — || align=right | 3.5 km || 
|-id=555 bgcolor=#d6d6d6
| 341555 ||  || — || October 16, 2007 || Kitt Peak || Spacewatch || KOR || align=right | 1.6 km || 
|-id=556 bgcolor=#d6d6d6
| 341556 ||  || — || October 16, 2007 || Kitt Peak || Spacewatch || — || align=right | 3.3 km || 
|-id=557 bgcolor=#E9E9E9
| 341557 ||  || — || October 8, 2007 || Kitt Peak || Spacewatch || — || align=right | 1.7 km || 
|-id=558 bgcolor=#d6d6d6
| 341558 ||  || — || October 16, 2007 || Kitt Peak || Spacewatch || HYG || align=right | 2.8 km || 
|-id=559 bgcolor=#d6d6d6
| 341559 ||  || — || October 16, 2007 || Kitt Peak || Spacewatch || — || align=right | 3.0 km || 
|-id=560 bgcolor=#d6d6d6
| 341560 ||  || — || October 16, 2007 || Catalina || CSS || — || align=right | 4.6 km || 
|-id=561 bgcolor=#d6d6d6
| 341561 ||  || — || October 19, 2007 || Kitt Peak || Spacewatch || EOS || align=right | 2.0 km || 
|-id=562 bgcolor=#d6d6d6
| 341562 ||  || — || October 20, 2007 || Catalina || CSS || — || align=right | 3.2 km || 
|-id=563 bgcolor=#d6d6d6
| 341563 ||  || — || October 20, 2007 || Mount Lemmon || Mount Lemmon Survey || EOS || align=right | 2.7 km || 
|-id=564 bgcolor=#d6d6d6
| 341564 ||  || — || October 18, 2007 || Kitt Peak || Spacewatch || — || align=right | 2.9 km || 
|-id=565 bgcolor=#d6d6d6
| 341565 ||  || — || October 18, 2007 || Kitt Peak || Spacewatch || KAR || align=right | 1.1 km || 
|-id=566 bgcolor=#d6d6d6
| 341566 ||  || — || October 20, 2007 || Catalina || CSS || — || align=right | 4.7 km || 
|-id=567 bgcolor=#d6d6d6
| 341567 ||  || — || October 20, 2007 || Mount Lemmon || Mount Lemmon Survey || — || align=right | 4.3 km || 
|-id=568 bgcolor=#d6d6d6
| 341568 ||  || — || October 21, 2007 || Kitt Peak || Spacewatch || — || align=right | 4.6 km || 
|-id=569 bgcolor=#d6d6d6
| 341569 ||  || — || October 24, 2007 || Mount Lemmon || Mount Lemmon Survey || EUP || align=right | 5.2 km || 
|-id=570 bgcolor=#d6d6d6
| 341570 ||  || — || October 30, 2007 || Kitt Peak || Spacewatch || THM || align=right | 2.6 km || 
|-id=571 bgcolor=#d6d6d6
| 341571 ||  || — || October 30, 2007 || Kitt Peak || Spacewatch || — || align=right | 2.6 km || 
|-id=572 bgcolor=#d6d6d6
| 341572 ||  || — || October 30, 2007 || Kitt Peak || Spacewatch || THM || align=right | 2.3 km || 
|-id=573 bgcolor=#d6d6d6
| 341573 ||  || — || October 30, 2007 || Mount Lemmon || Mount Lemmon Survey || — || align=right | 3.3 km || 
|-id=574 bgcolor=#d6d6d6
| 341574 ||  || — || October 30, 2007 || Mount Lemmon || Mount Lemmon Survey || — || align=right | 3.3 km || 
|-id=575 bgcolor=#d6d6d6
| 341575 ||  || — || October 30, 2007 || Mount Lemmon || Mount Lemmon Survey || — || align=right | 2.6 km || 
|-id=576 bgcolor=#d6d6d6
| 341576 ||  || — || October 30, 2007 || Mount Lemmon || Mount Lemmon Survey || EOS || align=right | 4.9 km || 
|-id=577 bgcolor=#d6d6d6
| 341577 ||  || — || October 30, 2007 || Kitt Peak || Spacewatch || — || align=right | 3.1 km || 
|-id=578 bgcolor=#d6d6d6
| 341578 ||  || — || October 30, 2007 || Kitt Peak || Spacewatch || — || align=right | 2.5 km || 
|-id=579 bgcolor=#d6d6d6
| 341579 ||  || — || October 30, 2007 || Kitt Peak || Spacewatch || — || align=right | 2.7 km || 
|-id=580 bgcolor=#d6d6d6
| 341580 ||  || — || October 31, 2007 || Mount Lemmon || Mount Lemmon Survey || — || align=right | 2.5 km || 
|-id=581 bgcolor=#d6d6d6
| 341581 ||  || — || October 31, 2007 || Catalina || CSS || — || align=right | 3.3 km || 
|-id=582 bgcolor=#d6d6d6
| 341582 ||  || — || October 30, 2007 || Kitt Peak || Spacewatch || — || align=right | 2.7 km || 
|-id=583 bgcolor=#d6d6d6
| 341583 ||  || — || October 30, 2007 || Kitt Peak || Spacewatch || — || align=right | 4.0 km || 
|-id=584 bgcolor=#d6d6d6
| 341584 ||  || — || October 30, 2007 || Kitt Peak || Spacewatch || THM || align=right | 2.4 km || 
|-id=585 bgcolor=#d6d6d6
| 341585 ||  || — || October 30, 2007 || Kitt Peak || Spacewatch || — || align=right | 3.0 km || 
|-id=586 bgcolor=#d6d6d6
| 341586 ||  || — || October 30, 2007 || Kitt Peak || Spacewatch || — || align=right | 3.1 km || 
|-id=587 bgcolor=#d6d6d6
| 341587 ||  || — || October 30, 2007 || Mount Lemmon || Mount Lemmon Survey || — || align=right | 2.7 km || 
|-id=588 bgcolor=#d6d6d6
| 341588 ||  || — || October 30, 2007 || Mount Lemmon || Mount Lemmon Survey || HYG || align=right | 2.9 km || 
|-id=589 bgcolor=#d6d6d6
| 341589 ||  || — || October 30, 2007 || Mount Lemmon || Mount Lemmon Survey || — || align=right | 2.1 km || 
|-id=590 bgcolor=#d6d6d6
| 341590 Emmawatson ||  ||  || October 30, 2007 || Mount Lemmon || Mount Lemmon Survey || — || align=right | 3.4 km || 
|-id=591 bgcolor=#d6d6d6
| 341591 ||  || — || October 31, 2007 || Mount Lemmon || Mount Lemmon Survey || — || align=right | 3.9 km || 
|-id=592 bgcolor=#d6d6d6
| 341592 ||  || — || October 30, 2007 || Mount Lemmon || Mount Lemmon Survey || — || align=right | 2.5 km || 
|-id=593 bgcolor=#d6d6d6
| 341593 ||  || — || October 30, 2007 || Kitt Peak || Spacewatch || — || align=right | 3.7 km || 
|-id=594 bgcolor=#d6d6d6
| 341594 ||  || — || October 30, 2007 || Kitt Peak || Spacewatch || THM || align=right | 2.7 km || 
|-id=595 bgcolor=#d6d6d6
| 341595 ||  || — || October 30, 2007 || Kitt Peak || Spacewatch || HYG || align=right | 3.0 km || 
|-id=596 bgcolor=#d6d6d6
| 341596 ||  || — || October 30, 2007 || Kitt Peak || Spacewatch || — || align=right | 3.8 km || 
|-id=597 bgcolor=#d6d6d6
| 341597 ||  || — || October 30, 2007 || Kitt Peak || Spacewatch || — || align=right | 2.4 km || 
|-id=598 bgcolor=#d6d6d6
| 341598 ||  || — || October 30, 2007 || Kitt Peak || Spacewatch || EOS || align=right | 2.2 km || 
|-id=599 bgcolor=#d6d6d6
| 341599 ||  || — || October 30, 2007 || Kitt Peak || Spacewatch || VER || align=right | 2.9 km || 
|-id=600 bgcolor=#d6d6d6
| 341600 ||  || — || October 30, 2007 || Kitt Peak || Spacewatch || — || align=right | 3.4 km || 
|}

341601–341700 

|-bgcolor=#d6d6d6
| 341601 ||  || — || October 30, 2007 || Kitt Peak || Spacewatch || 3:2 || align=right | 5.7 km || 
|-id=602 bgcolor=#d6d6d6
| 341602 ||  || — || October 31, 2007 || Catalina || CSS || — || align=right | 4.3 km || 
|-id=603 bgcolor=#d6d6d6
| 341603 ||  || — || October 30, 2007 || Kitt Peak || Spacewatch || — || align=right | 2.3 km || 
|-id=604 bgcolor=#d6d6d6
| 341604 ||  || — || October 30, 2007 || Kitt Peak || Spacewatch || — || align=right | 3.4 km || 
|-id=605 bgcolor=#d6d6d6
| 341605 ||  || — || October 31, 2007 || Kitt Peak || Spacewatch || — || align=right | 3.5 km || 
|-id=606 bgcolor=#d6d6d6
| 341606 ||  || — || October 31, 2007 || Kitt Peak || Spacewatch || EOS || align=right | 2.4 km || 
|-id=607 bgcolor=#d6d6d6
| 341607 ||  || — || October 31, 2007 || Mount Lemmon || Mount Lemmon Survey || KOR || align=right | 1.3 km || 
|-id=608 bgcolor=#d6d6d6
| 341608 ||  || — || October 31, 2007 || Mount Lemmon || Mount Lemmon Survey || — || align=right | 2.9 km || 
|-id=609 bgcolor=#d6d6d6
| 341609 ||  || — || October 17, 2007 || Mount Lemmon || Mount Lemmon Survey || EOS || align=right | 2.5 km || 
|-id=610 bgcolor=#d6d6d6
| 341610 ||  || — || October 30, 2007 || Kitt Peak || Spacewatch || — || align=right | 3.4 km || 
|-id=611 bgcolor=#d6d6d6
| 341611 ||  || — || October 20, 2007 || Mount Lemmon || Mount Lemmon Survey || — || align=right | 4.6 km || 
|-id=612 bgcolor=#d6d6d6
| 341612 ||  || — || October 24, 2007 || Mount Lemmon || Mount Lemmon Survey || — || align=right | 3.6 km || 
|-id=613 bgcolor=#d6d6d6
| 341613 ||  || — || October 16, 2007 || Mount Lemmon || Mount Lemmon Survey || EOS || align=right | 2.3 km || 
|-id=614 bgcolor=#d6d6d6
| 341614 ||  || — || October 18, 2007 || Kitt Peak || Spacewatch || — || align=right | 3.3 km || 
|-id=615 bgcolor=#d6d6d6
| 341615 ||  || — || October 16, 2007 || Catalina || CSS || — || align=right | 3.8 km || 
|-id=616 bgcolor=#d6d6d6
| 341616 ||  || — || October 17, 2007 || Mount Lemmon || Mount Lemmon Survey || EOS || align=right | 2.2 km || 
|-id=617 bgcolor=#d6d6d6
| 341617 ||  || — || October 19, 2007 || Kitt Peak || Spacewatch || — || align=right | 4.8 km || 
|-id=618 bgcolor=#d6d6d6
| 341618 ||  || — || October 20, 2007 || Mount Lemmon || Mount Lemmon Survey || — || align=right | 2.8 km || 
|-id=619 bgcolor=#d6d6d6
| 341619 ||  || — || October 30, 2007 || Kitt Peak || Spacewatch || — || align=right | 3.2 km || 
|-id=620 bgcolor=#d6d6d6
| 341620 ||  || — || October 17, 2007 || Mount Lemmon || Mount Lemmon Survey || — || align=right | 3.7 km || 
|-id=621 bgcolor=#d6d6d6
| 341621 ||  || — || October 21, 2007 || Kitt Peak || Spacewatch || — || align=right | 3.2 km || 
|-id=622 bgcolor=#d6d6d6
| 341622 ||  || — || October 21, 2007 || Catalina || CSS || EOS || align=right | 2.6 km || 
|-id=623 bgcolor=#d6d6d6
| 341623 ||  || — || October 21, 2007 || Mount Lemmon || Mount Lemmon Survey || VER || align=right | 5.8 km || 
|-id=624 bgcolor=#d6d6d6
| 341624 ||  || — || October 21, 2007 || Kitt Peak || Spacewatch || — || align=right | 3.2 km || 
|-id=625 bgcolor=#d6d6d6
| 341625 ||  || — || November 2, 2007 || Pla D'Arguines || R. Ferrando || EOS || align=right | 2.2 km || 
|-id=626 bgcolor=#d6d6d6
| 341626 ||  || — || November 3, 2007 || La Cañada || J. Lacruz || — || align=right | 3.2 km || 
|-id=627 bgcolor=#d6d6d6
| 341627 ||  || — || November 3, 2007 || Majorca || OAM Obs. || — || align=right | 3.2 km || 
|-id=628 bgcolor=#d6d6d6
| 341628 ||  || — || November 2, 2007 || Kitt Peak || Spacewatch || EOS || align=right | 2.1 km || 
|-id=629 bgcolor=#d6d6d6
| 341629 ||  || — || November 2, 2007 || Mount Lemmon || Mount Lemmon Survey || HYG || align=right | 2.9 km || 
|-id=630 bgcolor=#d6d6d6
| 341630 ||  || — || November 1, 2007 || Črni Vrh || Črni Vrh || EOS || align=right | 3.0 km || 
|-id=631 bgcolor=#d6d6d6
| 341631 ||  || — || November 1, 2007 || Kitt Peak || Spacewatch || TIR || align=right | 3.1 km || 
|-id=632 bgcolor=#d6d6d6
| 341632 ||  || — || November 1, 2007 || Mount Lemmon || Mount Lemmon Survey || — || align=right | 2.2 km || 
|-id=633 bgcolor=#E9E9E9
| 341633 ||  || — || November 1, 2007 || Kitt Peak || Spacewatch || MRX || align=right | 1.3 km || 
|-id=634 bgcolor=#d6d6d6
| 341634 ||  || — || November 1, 2007 || Mount Lemmon || Mount Lemmon Survey || — || align=right | 3.8 km || 
|-id=635 bgcolor=#d6d6d6
| 341635 ||  || — || November 1, 2007 || Mount Lemmon || Mount Lemmon Survey || — || align=right | 2.7 km || 
|-id=636 bgcolor=#d6d6d6
| 341636 ||  || — || November 2, 2007 || Catalina || CSS || — || align=right | 4.2 km || 
|-id=637 bgcolor=#d6d6d6
| 341637 ||  || — || November 2, 2007 || Mount Lemmon || Mount Lemmon Survey || — || align=right | 2.9 km || 
|-id=638 bgcolor=#d6d6d6
| 341638 ||  || — || November 2, 2007 || Mount Lemmon || Mount Lemmon Survey || — || align=right | 2.9 km || 
|-id=639 bgcolor=#d6d6d6
| 341639 ||  || — || November 3, 2007 || Mount Lemmon || Mount Lemmon Survey || THM || align=right | 2.4 km || 
|-id=640 bgcolor=#d6d6d6
| 341640 ||  || — || November 2, 2007 || Kitt Peak || Spacewatch || — || align=right | 2.7 km || 
|-id=641 bgcolor=#d6d6d6
| 341641 ||  || — || November 2, 2007 || Kitt Peak || Spacewatch || ANF || align=right | 1.8 km || 
|-id=642 bgcolor=#d6d6d6
| 341642 ||  || — || November 2, 2007 || Kitt Peak || Spacewatch || — || align=right | 2.4 km || 
|-id=643 bgcolor=#d6d6d6
| 341643 ||  || — || November 2, 2007 || Catalina || CSS || EOS || align=right | 2.0 km || 
|-id=644 bgcolor=#d6d6d6
| 341644 ||  || — || November 2, 2007 || Catalina || CSS || — || align=right | 5.0 km || 
|-id=645 bgcolor=#d6d6d6
| 341645 ||  || — || November 1, 2007 || Kitt Peak || Spacewatch || — || align=right | 3.4 km || 
|-id=646 bgcolor=#d6d6d6
| 341646 ||  || — || November 1, 2007 || Kitt Peak || Spacewatch || — || align=right | 5.6 km || 
|-id=647 bgcolor=#d6d6d6
| 341647 ||  || — || November 1, 2007 || Kitt Peak || Spacewatch || — || align=right | 4.9 km || 
|-id=648 bgcolor=#d6d6d6
| 341648 ||  || — || November 1, 2007 || Kitt Peak || Spacewatch || — || align=right | 2.5 km || 
|-id=649 bgcolor=#d6d6d6
| 341649 ||  || — || November 1, 2007 || Kitt Peak || Spacewatch || — || align=right | 3.0 km || 
|-id=650 bgcolor=#d6d6d6
| 341650 ||  || — || November 1, 2007 || Kitt Peak || Spacewatch || — || align=right | 3.2 km || 
|-id=651 bgcolor=#d6d6d6
| 341651 ||  || — || November 1, 2007 || Kitt Peak || Spacewatch || — || align=right | 3.1 km || 
|-id=652 bgcolor=#d6d6d6
| 341652 ||  || — || November 1, 2007 || Kitt Peak || Spacewatch || EOS || align=right | 2.1 km || 
|-id=653 bgcolor=#d6d6d6
| 341653 ||  || — || November 1, 2007 || Kitt Peak || Spacewatch || — || align=right | 2.8 km || 
|-id=654 bgcolor=#d6d6d6
| 341654 ||  || — || November 1, 2007 || Kitt Peak || Spacewatch || — || align=right | 3.0 km || 
|-id=655 bgcolor=#d6d6d6
| 341655 ||  || — || November 1, 2007 || Kitt Peak || Spacewatch || EOS || align=right | 1.8 km || 
|-id=656 bgcolor=#d6d6d6
| 341656 ||  || — || November 1, 2007 || Kitt Peak || Spacewatch || — || align=right | 3.1 km || 
|-id=657 bgcolor=#d6d6d6
| 341657 ||  || — || November 1, 2007 || Kitt Peak || Spacewatch || — || align=right | 2.9 km || 
|-id=658 bgcolor=#d6d6d6
| 341658 ||  || — || November 1, 2007 || Kitt Peak || Spacewatch || MRC || align=right | 3.0 km || 
|-id=659 bgcolor=#d6d6d6
| 341659 ||  || — || November 1, 2007 || Kitt Peak || Spacewatch || — || align=right | 4.4 km || 
|-id=660 bgcolor=#d6d6d6
| 341660 ||  || — || November 1, 2007 || Kitt Peak || Spacewatch || THM || align=right | 2.6 km || 
|-id=661 bgcolor=#d6d6d6
| 341661 ||  || — || November 1, 2007 || Kitt Peak || Spacewatch || THM || align=right | 2.6 km || 
|-id=662 bgcolor=#d6d6d6
| 341662 ||  || — || November 1, 2007 || Kitt Peak || Spacewatch || — || align=right | 3.2 km || 
|-id=663 bgcolor=#d6d6d6
| 341663 ||  || — || November 1, 2007 || Kitt Peak || Spacewatch || — || align=right | 4.2 km || 
|-id=664 bgcolor=#d6d6d6
| 341664 ||  || — || November 2, 2007 || Kitt Peak || Spacewatch || LIX || align=right | 4.3 km || 
|-id=665 bgcolor=#d6d6d6
| 341665 ||  || — || November 3, 2007 || Kitt Peak || Spacewatch || THM || align=right | 2.8 km || 
|-id=666 bgcolor=#d6d6d6
| 341666 ||  || — || November 3, 2007 || Kitt Peak || Spacewatch || THM || align=right | 2.5 km || 
|-id=667 bgcolor=#d6d6d6
| 341667 ||  || — || November 3, 2007 || Kitt Peak || Spacewatch || — || align=right | 3.9 km || 
|-id=668 bgcolor=#d6d6d6
| 341668 ||  || — || February 13, 1999 || Kitt Peak || Spacewatch || — || align=right | 4.1 km || 
|-id=669 bgcolor=#d6d6d6
| 341669 ||  || — || November 2, 2007 || Socorro || LINEAR || — || align=right | 3.9 km || 
|-id=670 bgcolor=#d6d6d6
| 341670 ||  || — || November 2, 2007 || Socorro || LINEAR || — || align=right | 3.7 km || 
|-id=671 bgcolor=#d6d6d6
| 341671 ||  || — || November 2, 2007 || Socorro || LINEAR || EOS || align=right | 2.2 km || 
|-id=672 bgcolor=#d6d6d6
| 341672 ||  || — || November 2, 2007 || Socorro || LINEAR || — || align=right | 5.5 km || 
|-id=673 bgcolor=#d6d6d6
| 341673 ||  || — || November 2, 2007 || Socorro || LINEAR || ALA || align=right | 4.2 km || 
|-id=674 bgcolor=#d6d6d6
| 341674 ||  || — || November 3, 2007 || Socorro || LINEAR || — || align=right | 4.5 km || 
|-id=675 bgcolor=#d6d6d6
| 341675 ||  || — || November 5, 2007 || Socorro || LINEAR || — || align=right | 3.7 km || 
|-id=676 bgcolor=#d6d6d6
| 341676 ||  || — || November 5, 2007 || Socorro || LINEAR || URS || align=right | 5.6 km || 
|-id=677 bgcolor=#FA8072
| 341677 ||  || — || November 8, 2007 || Socorro || LINEAR || H || align=right data-sort-value="0.95" | 950 m || 
|-id=678 bgcolor=#d6d6d6
| 341678 ||  || — || November 3, 2007 || Socorro || LINEAR || — || align=right | 3.6 km || 
|-id=679 bgcolor=#d6d6d6
| 341679 ||  || — || November 8, 2007 || Socorro || LINEAR || — || align=right | 3.0 km || 
|-id=680 bgcolor=#d6d6d6
| 341680 ||  || — || November 2, 2007 || Kitt Peak || Spacewatch || — || align=right | 2.6 km || 
|-id=681 bgcolor=#d6d6d6
| 341681 ||  || — || November 3, 2007 || Kitt Peak || Spacewatch || — || align=right | 2.8 km || 
|-id=682 bgcolor=#d6d6d6
| 341682 ||  || — || November 3, 2007 || Kitt Peak || Spacewatch || — || align=right | 3.6 km || 
|-id=683 bgcolor=#d6d6d6
| 341683 ||  || — || November 3, 2007 || Kitt Peak || Spacewatch || — || align=right | 5.1 km || 
|-id=684 bgcolor=#E9E9E9
| 341684 ||  || — || November 3, 2007 || Kitt Peak || Spacewatch || — || align=right | 2.4 km || 
|-id=685 bgcolor=#d6d6d6
| 341685 ||  || — || November 3, 2007 || Kitt Peak || Spacewatch || — || align=right | 4.9 km || 
|-id=686 bgcolor=#d6d6d6
| 341686 ||  || — || November 3, 2007 || Kitt Peak || Spacewatch || VER || align=right | 3.0 km || 
|-id=687 bgcolor=#d6d6d6
| 341687 ||  || — || November 4, 2007 || Mount Lemmon || Mount Lemmon Survey || — || align=right | 3.2 km || 
|-id=688 bgcolor=#d6d6d6
| 341688 ||  || — || November 5, 2007 || Kitt Peak || Spacewatch || — || align=right | 4.7 km || 
|-id=689 bgcolor=#d6d6d6
| 341689 ||  || — || November 5, 2007 || Mount Lemmon || Mount Lemmon Survey || — || align=right | 2.8 km || 
|-id=690 bgcolor=#fefefe
| 341690 ||  || — || November 11, 2007 || Catalina || CSS || H || align=right data-sort-value="0.71" | 710 m || 
|-id=691 bgcolor=#d6d6d6
| 341691 ||  || — || November 2, 2007 || Catalina || CSS || — || align=right | 4.0 km || 
|-id=692 bgcolor=#d6d6d6
| 341692 ||  || — || November 3, 2007 || Kitt Peak || Spacewatch || KOR || align=right | 1.4 km || 
|-id=693 bgcolor=#d6d6d6
| 341693 ||  || — || November 4, 2007 || Kitt Peak || Spacewatch || — || align=right | 4.1 km || 
|-id=694 bgcolor=#d6d6d6
| 341694 ||  || — || November 4, 2007 || Kitt Peak || Spacewatch || — || align=right | 3.6 km || 
|-id=695 bgcolor=#d6d6d6
| 341695 ||  || — || November 4, 2007 || Mount Lemmon || Mount Lemmon Survey || — || align=right | 2.5 km || 
|-id=696 bgcolor=#d6d6d6
| 341696 ||  || — || November 4, 2007 || Kitt Peak || Spacewatch || — || align=right | 2.8 km || 
|-id=697 bgcolor=#d6d6d6
| 341697 ||  || — || November 2, 2007 || Kitt Peak || Spacewatch || — || align=right | 3.7 km || 
|-id=698 bgcolor=#d6d6d6
| 341698 ||  || — || November 4, 2007 || Kitt Peak || Spacewatch || EOS || align=right | 2.0 km || 
|-id=699 bgcolor=#d6d6d6
| 341699 ||  || — || November 4, 2007 || Kitt Peak || Spacewatch || — || align=right | 3.2 km || 
|-id=700 bgcolor=#d6d6d6
| 341700 ||  || — || November 5, 2007 || Kitt Peak || Spacewatch || — || align=right | 2.8 km || 
|}

341701–341800 

|-bgcolor=#d6d6d6
| 341701 ||  || — || November 5, 2007 || Kitt Peak || Spacewatch || — || align=right | 3.8 km || 
|-id=702 bgcolor=#d6d6d6
| 341702 ||  || — || November 5, 2007 || Kitt Peak || Spacewatch || — || align=right | 4.1 km || 
|-id=703 bgcolor=#d6d6d6
| 341703 ||  || — || November 5, 2007 || Kitt Peak || Spacewatch || — || align=right | 4.5 km || 
|-id=704 bgcolor=#d6d6d6
| 341704 ||  || — || November 5, 2007 || Kitt Peak || Spacewatch || HYG || align=right | 3.3 km || 
|-id=705 bgcolor=#d6d6d6
| 341705 ||  || — || November 8, 2007 || Kitt Peak || Spacewatch || — || align=right | 2.2 km || 
|-id=706 bgcolor=#d6d6d6
| 341706 ||  || — || November 2, 2007 || Catalina || CSS || — || align=right | 4.0 km || 
|-id=707 bgcolor=#d6d6d6
| 341707 ||  || — || October 19, 2007 || Kitt Peak || Spacewatch || — || align=right | 2.5 km || 
|-id=708 bgcolor=#d6d6d6
| 341708 ||  || — || November 7, 2007 || Catalina || CSS || — || align=right | 3.3 km || 
|-id=709 bgcolor=#d6d6d6
| 341709 ||  || — || October 8, 2007 || Kitt Peak || Spacewatch || — || align=right | 3.0 km || 
|-id=710 bgcolor=#d6d6d6
| 341710 ||  || — || November 8, 2007 || Catalina || CSS || — || align=right | 3.0 km || 
|-id=711 bgcolor=#d6d6d6
| 341711 ||  || — || November 8, 2007 || Catalina || CSS || TIR || align=right | 3.5 km || 
|-id=712 bgcolor=#d6d6d6
| 341712 ||  || — || November 11, 2007 || Goodricke-Pigott || R. A. Tucker || URS || align=right | 5.0 km || 
|-id=713 bgcolor=#d6d6d6
| 341713 ||  || — || November 13, 2007 || Bisei SG Center || BATTeRS || — || align=right | 4.7 km || 
|-id=714 bgcolor=#d6d6d6
| 341714 ||  || — || November 4, 2007 || Mount Lemmon || Mount Lemmon Survey || — || align=right | 4.5 km || 
|-id=715 bgcolor=#E9E9E9
| 341715 ||  || — || November 7, 2007 || Mount Lemmon || Mount Lemmon Survey || — || align=right | 2.1 km || 
|-id=716 bgcolor=#d6d6d6
| 341716 ||  || — || November 9, 2007 || Mount Lemmon || Mount Lemmon Survey || KOR || align=right | 1.3 km || 
|-id=717 bgcolor=#d6d6d6
| 341717 ||  || — || November 9, 2007 || Catalina || CSS || — || align=right | 3.3 km || 
|-id=718 bgcolor=#d6d6d6
| 341718 ||  || — || November 9, 2007 || Kitt Peak || Spacewatch || — || align=right | 2.6 km || 
|-id=719 bgcolor=#d6d6d6
| 341719 ||  || — || November 9, 2007 || Kitt Peak || Spacewatch || — || align=right | 3.3 km || 
|-id=720 bgcolor=#d6d6d6
| 341720 ||  || — || October 20, 2007 || Mount Lemmon || Mount Lemmon Survey || — || align=right | 3.8 km || 
|-id=721 bgcolor=#d6d6d6
| 341721 ||  || — || November 9, 2007 || Kitt Peak || Spacewatch || — || align=right | 3.7 km || 
|-id=722 bgcolor=#d6d6d6
| 341722 ||  || — || November 9, 2007 || Kitt Peak || Spacewatch || — || align=right | 4.5 km || 
|-id=723 bgcolor=#d6d6d6
| 341723 ||  || — || November 9, 2007 || Kitt Peak || Spacewatch || — || align=right | 3.8 km || 
|-id=724 bgcolor=#d6d6d6
| 341724 ||  || — || November 9, 2007 || Kitt Peak || Spacewatch || — || align=right | 3.8 km || 
|-id=725 bgcolor=#d6d6d6
| 341725 ||  || — || November 9, 2007 || Kitt Peak || Spacewatch || — || align=right | 4.1 km || 
|-id=726 bgcolor=#d6d6d6
| 341726 ||  || — || November 6, 2007 || Purple Mountain || PMO NEO || — || align=right | 3.5 km || 
|-id=727 bgcolor=#d6d6d6
| 341727 ||  || — || November 12, 2007 || Mount Lemmon || Mount Lemmon Survey || AEG || align=right | 5.0 km || 
|-id=728 bgcolor=#d6d6d6
| 341728 ||  || — || November 7, 2007 || Kitt Peak || Spacewatch || EOS || align=right | 2.5 km || 
|-id=729 bgcolor=#E9E9E9
| 341729 ||  || — || November 7, 2007 || Kitt Peak || Spacewatch || — || align=right | 2.0 km || 
|-id=730 bgcolor=#d6d6d6
| 341730 ||  || — || November 7, 2007 || Kitt Peak || Spacewatch || — || align=right | 3.1 km || 
|-id=731 bgcolor=#d6d6d6
| 341731 ||  || — || November 7, 2007 || Kitt Peak || Spacewatch || — || align=right | 2.6 km || 
|-id=732 bgcolor=#d6d6d6
| 341732 ||  || — || November 7, 2007 || Catalina || CSS || — || align=right | 2.8 km || 
|-id=733 bgcolor=#d6d6d6
| 341733 ||  || — || November 12, 2007 || Catalina || CSS || — || align=right | 3.2 km || 
|-id=734 bgcolor=#d6d6d6
| 341734 ||  || — || November 13, 2007 || Dauban || Chante-Perdrix Obs. || — || align=right | 4.0 km || 
|-id=735 bgcolor=#d6d6d6
| 341735 ||  || — || November 8, 2007 || Catalina || CSS || — || align=right | 3.6 km || 
|-id=736 bgcolor=#d6d6d6
| 341736 ||  || — || November 14, 2007 || Mount Lemmon || Mount Lemmon Survey || URS || align=right | 5.0 km || 
|-id=737 bgcolor=#d6d6d6
| 341737 ||  || — || November 12, 2007 || Catalina || CSS || — || align=right | 3.2 km || 
|-id=738 bgcolor=#d6d6d6
| 341738 ||  || — || November 15, 2007 || Catalina || CSS || — || align=right | 4.0 km || 
|-id=739 bgcolor=#d6d6d6
| 341739 ||  || — || November 12, 2007 || Mount Lemmon || Mount Lemmon Survey || EOS || align=right | 2.7 km || 
|-id=740 bgcolor=#d6d6d6
| 341740 ||  || — || November 13, 2007 || Catalina || CSS || — || align=right | 3.8 km || 
|-id=741 bgcolor=#d6d6d6
| 341741 ||  || — || November 13, 2007 || Kitt Peak || Spacewatch || — || align=right | 2.8 km || 
|-id=742 bgcolor=#d6d6d6
| 341742 ||  || — || November 13, 2007 || Kitt Peak || Spacewatch || — || align=right | 4.3 km || 
|-id=743 bgcolor=#d6d6d6
| 341743 ||  || — || November 11, 2007 || Cerro Burek || Alianza S4 Obs. || TIR || align=right | 3.2 km || 
|-id=744 bgcolor=#d6d6d6
| 341744 ||  || — || November 14, 2007 || Bisei SG Center || BATTeRS || — || align=right | 2.7 km || 
|-id=745 bgcolor=#d6d6d6
| 341745 ||  || — || November 12, 2007 || Socorro || LINEAR || — || align=right | 3.1 km || 
|-id=746 bgcolor=#d6d6d6
| 341746 ||  || — || November 8, 2007 || Kitt Peak || Spacewatch || — || align=right | 3.9 km || 
|-id=747 bgcolor=#d6d6d6
| 341747 ||  || — || November 13, 2007 || Kitt Peak || Spacewatch || THM || align=right | 2.0 km || 
|-id=748 bgcolor=#d6d6d6
| 341748 ||  || — || November 13, 2007 || Kitt Peak || Spacewatch || — || align=right | 4.1 km || 
|-id=749 bgcolor=#d6d6d6
| 341749 ||  || — || November 14, 2007 || Kitt Peak || Spacewatch || EOS || align=right | 2.0 km || 
|-id=750 bgcolor=#d6d6d6
| 341750 ||  || — || November 14, 2007 || Kitt Peak || Spacewatch || — || align=right | 3.6 km || 
|-id=751 bgcolor=#d6d6d6
| 341751 ||  || — || November 14, 2007 || Kitt Peak || Spacewatch || HYG || align=right | 2.8 km || 
|-id=752 bgcolor=#d6d6d6
| 341752 ||  || — || November 15, 2007 || Anderson Mesa || LONEOS || EOS || align=right | 2.1 km || 
|-id=753 bgcolor=#d6d6d6
| 341753 ||  || — || September 21, 2007 || Socorro || LINEAR || — || align=right | 4.5 km || 
|-id=754 bgcolor=#d6d6d6
| 341754 ||  || — || November 15, 2007 || Catalina || CSS || — || align=right | 4.2 km || 
|-id=755 bgcolor=#E9E9E9
| 341755 ||  || — || November 3, 2007 || Catalina || CSS || WAT || align=right | 2.0 km || 
|-id=756 bgcolor=#d6d6d6
| 341756 ||  || — || November 1, 2007 || Kitt Peak || Spacewatch || — || align=right | 3.6 km || 
|-id=757 bgcolor=#d6d6d6
| 341757 ||  || — || November 1, 2007 || Kitt Peak || Spacewatch || — || align=right | 2.8 km || 
|-id=758 bgcolor=#d6d6d6
| 341758 ||  || — || November 5, 2007 || Purple Mountain || PMO NEO || — || align=right | 4.0 km || 
|-id=759 bgcolor=#d6d6d6
| 341759 ||  || — || November 9, 2007 || Catalina || CSS || — || align=right | 4.1 km || 
|-id=760 bgcolor=#d6d6d6
| 341760 ||  || — || November 4, 2007 || Kitt Peak || Spacewatch || HYG || align=right | 3.6 km || 
|-id=761 bgcolor=#d6d6d6
| 341761 ||  || — || November 4, 2007 || Kitt Peak || Spacewatch || EOS || align=right | 2.4 km || 
|-id=762 bgcolor=#d6d6d6
| 341762 ||  || — || November 5, 2007 || Kitt Peak || Spacewatch || URS || align=right | 4.1 km || 
|-id=763 bgcolor=#d6d6d6
| 341763 ||  || — || November 4, 2007 || Socorro || LINEAR || — || align=right | 3.4 km || 
|-id=764 bgcolor=#d6d6d6
| 341764 ||  || — || November 5, 2007 || Kitt Peak || Spacewatch || HYG || align=right | 2.7 km || 
|-id=765 bgcolor=#d6d6d6
| 341765 ||  || — || November 8, 2007 || Catalina || CSS || EMA || align=right | 5.0 km || 
|-id=766 bgcolor=#d6d6d6
| 341766 ||  || — || November 2, 2007 || Socorro || LINEAR || — || align=right | 3.2 km || 
|-id=767 bgcolor=#d6d6d6
| 341767 ||  || — || November 2, 2007 || Kitt Peak || Spacewatch || — || align=right | 2.3 km || 
|-id=768 bgcolor=#d6d6d6
| 341768 ||  || — || November 5, 2007 || Mount Lemmon || Mount Lemmon Survey || HYG || align=right | 3.0 km || 
|-id=769 bgcolor=#d6d6d6
| 341769 ||  || — || November 9, 2007 || Kitt Peak || Spacewatch || — || align=right | 2.7 km || 
|-id=770 bgcolor=#d6d6d6
| 341770 ||  || — || July 22, 1995 || Kitt Peak || Spacewatch || THM || align=right | 2.6 km || 
|-id=771 bgcolor=#d6d6d6
| 341771 ||  || — || August 14, 2006 || Siding Spring || SSS || MEL || align=right | 3.9 km || 
|-id=772 bgcolor=#d6d6d6
| 341772 ||  || — || November 14, 2007 || Kitt Peak || Spacewatch || — || align=right | 3.2 km || 
|-id=773 bgcolor=#d6d6d6
| 341773 ||  || — || November 17, 2007 || Bisei SG Center || BATTeRS || — || align=right | 2.9 km || 
|-id=774 bgcolor=#d6d6d6
| 341774 ||  || — || November 16, 2007 || Mount Lemmon || Mount Lemmon Survey || — || align=right | 3.4 km || 
|-id=775 bgcolor=#d6d6d6
| 341775 ||  || — || November 18, 2007 || Socorro || LINEAR || HYG || align=right | 2.8 km || 
|-id=776 bgcolor=#d6d6d6
| 341776 ||  || — || November 18, 2007 || Socorro || LINEAR || — || align=right | 3.8 km || 
|-id=777 bgcolor=#d6d6d6
| 341777 ||  || — || November 18, 2007 || Socorro || LINEAR || — || align=right | 3.2 km || 
|-id=778 bgcolor=#d6d6d6
| 341778 ||  || — || November 18, 2007 || Socorro || LINEAR || LIX || align=right | 3.6 km || 
|-id=779 bgcolor=#d6d6d6
| 341779 ||  || — || November 18, 2007 || Mount Lemmon || Mount Lemmon Survey || — || align=right | 2.8 km || 
|-id=780 bgcolor=#d6d6d6
| 341780 ||  || — || November 2, 2007 || Kitt Peak || Spacewatch || — || align=right | 2.4 km || 
|-id=781 bgcolor=#d6d6d6
| 341781 ||  || — || November 19, 2007 || Kitt Peak || Spacewatch || — || align=right | 3.6 km || 
|-id=782 bgcolor=#d6d6d6
| 341782 ||  || — || November 19, 2007 || Mount Lemmon || Mount Lemmon Survey || — || align=right | 3.0 km || 
|-id=783 bgcolor=#d6d6d6
| 341783 ||  || — || November 19, 2007 || Mount Lemmon || Mount Lemmon Survey || — || align=right | 5.4 km || 
|-id=784 bgcolor=#d6d6d6
| 341784 ||  || — || October 15, 2007 || Mount Lemmon || Mount Lemmon Survey || — || align=right | 2.7 km || 
|-id=785 bgcolor=#d6d6d6
| 341785 ||  || — || November 19, 2007 || Kitt Peak || Spacewatch || — || align=right | 3.0 km || 
|-id=786 bgcolor=#d6d6d6
| 341786 ||  || — || November 20, 2007 || Mount Lemmon || Mount Lemmon Survey || VER || align=right | 6.1 km || 
|-id=787 bgcolor=#d6d6d6
| 341787 ||  || — || November 20, 2007 || Mount Lemmon || Mount Lemmon Survey || EOS || align=right | 3.7 km || 
|-id=788 bgcolor=#d6d6d6
| 341788 ||  || — || November 20, 2007 || Mount Lemmon || Mount Lemmon Survey || — || align=right | 4.5 km || 
|-id=789 bgcolor=#d6d6d6
| 341789 ||  || — || November 20, 2007 || Kitt Peak || Spacewatch || — || align=right | 3.6 km || 
|-id=790 bgcolor=#d6d6d6
| 341790 ||  || — || November 20, 2007 || Kitt Peak || Spacewatch || EOS || align=right | 2.3 km || 
|-id=791 bgcolor=#d6d6d6
| 341791 ||  || — || November 18, 2007 || Kitt Peak || Spacewatch || — || align=right | 5.2 km || 
|-id=792 bgcolor=#d6d6d6
| 341792 ||  || — || December 4, 2007 || Catalina || CSS || — || align=right | 6.3 km || 
|-id=793 bgcolor=#d6d6d6
| 341793 ||  || — || December 5, 2007 || Bisei SG Center || BATTeRS || — || align=right | 3.2 km || 
|-id=794 bgcolor=#d6d6d6
| 341794 ||  || — || December 4, 2007 || Kitt Peak || Spacewatch || — || align=right | 3.2 km || 
|-id=795 bgcolor=#d6d6d6
| 341795 ||  || — || December 6, 2007 || La Sagra || OAM Obs. || — || align=right | 3.6 km || 
|-id=796 bgcolor=#d6d6d6
| 341796 ||  || — || December 4, 2007 || Catalina || CSS || — || align=right | 4.3 km || 
|-id=797 bgcolor=#d6d6d6
| 341797 ||  || — || December 10, 2007 || Socorro || LINEAR || EOS || align=right | 2.7 km || 
|-id=798 bgcolor=#d6d6d6
| 341798 ||  || — || December 12, 2007 || Socorro || LINEAR || 637 || align=right | 3.0 km || 
|-id=799 bgcolor=#d6d6d6
| 341799 ||  || — || December 13, 2007 || Dauban || Chante-Perdrix Obs. || THM || align=right | 2.7 km || 
|-id=800 bgcolor=#d6d6d6
| 341800 ||  || — || December 14, 2007 || La Sagra || OAM Obs. || — || align=right | 3.1 km || 
|}

341801–341900 

|-bgcolor=#d6d6d6
| 341801 ||  || — || December 14, 2007 || Kitt Peak || Spacewatch || THM || align=right | 2.9 km || 
|-id=802 bgcolor=#d6d6d6
| 341802 ||  || — || December 15, 2007 || Mount Lemmon || Mount Lemmon Survey || NAE || align=right | 2.2 km || 
|-id=803 bgcolor=#fefefe
| 341803 ||  || — || October 25, 2007 || Mount Lemmon || Mount Lemmon Survey || — || align=right | 1.2 km || 
|-id=804 bgcolor=#d6d6d6
| 341804 ||  || — || December 13, 2007 || Socorro || LINEAR || — || align=right | 3.4 km || 
|-id=805 bgcolor=#d6d6d6
| 341805 ||  || — || December 13, 2007 || Socorro || LINEAR || MEL || align=right | 3.8 km || 
|-id=806 bgcolor=#E9E9E9
| 341806 ||  || — || December 13, 2007 || Socorro || LINEAR || — || align=right | 4.0 km || 
|-id=807 bgcolor=#d6d6d6
| 341807 ||  || — || December 15, 2007 || Socorro || LINEAR || — || align=right | 4.3 km || 
|-id=808 bgcolor=#d6d6d6
| 341808 ||  || — || December 15, 2007 || Kitt Peak || Spacewatch || — || align=right | 2.9 km || 
|-id=809 bgcolor=#d6d6d6
| 341809 ||  || — || December 15, 2007 || Kitt Peak || Spacewatch || — || align=right | 2.3 km || 
|-id=810 bgcolor=#d6d6d6
| 341810 ||  || — || December 15, 2007 || Kitt Peak || Spacewatch || 7:4 || align=right | 3.1 km || 
|-id=811 bgcolor=#d6d6d6
| 341811 ||  || — || December 15, 2007 || Kitt Peak || Spacewatch || — || align=right | 2.7 km || 
|-id=812 bgcolor=#d6d6d6
| 341812 ||  || — || December 5, 2007 || Kitt Peak || Spacewatch || THM || align=right | 2.0 km || 
|-id=813 bgcolor=#d6d6d6
| 341813 ||  || — || September 28, 2001 || Palomar || NEAT || — || align=right | 3.7 km || 
|-id=814 bgcolor=#d6d6d6
| 341814 ||  || — || October 11, 2006 || Palomar || NEAT || — || align=right | 4.1 km || 
|-id=815 bgcolor=#d6d6d6
| 341815 ||  || — || December 5, 2007 || Socorro || LINEAR || EOS || align=right | 2.5 km || 
|-id=816 bgcolor=#FFC2E0
| 341816 ||  || — || December 16, 2007 || Catalina || CSS || AMO +1km || align=right | 1.1 km || 
|-id=817 bgcolor=#d6d6d6
| 341817 ||  || — || December 17, 2007 || Bergisch Gladbac || W. Bickel || — || align=right | 2.5 km || 
|-id=818 bgcolor=#d6d6d6
| 341818 ||  || — || December 16, 2007 || Kitt Peak || Spacewatch || — || align=right | 3.9 km || 
|-id=819 bgcolor=#d6d6d6
| 341819 ||  || — || December 28, 2007 || Kitt Peak || Spacewatch || — || align=right | 5.5 km || 
|-id=820 bgcolor=#d6d6d6
| 341820 ||  || — || December 30, 2007 || Kitt Peak || Spacewatch || — || align=right | 3.5 km || 
|-id=821 bgcolor=#d6d6d6
| 341821 ||  || — || December 30, 2007 || Catalina || CSS || HYG || align=right | 3.1 km || 
|-id=822 bgcolor=#d6d6d6
| 341822 ||  || — || December 30, 2007 || Kitt Peak || Spacewatch || — || align=right | 2.7 km || 
|-id=823 bgcolor=#d6d6d6
| 341823 ||  || — || December 17, 2007 || Kitt Peak || Spacewatch || THM || align=right | 2.6 km || 
|-id=824 bgcolor=#d6d6d6
| 341824 ||  || — || March 17, 2004 || Kitt Peak || Spacewatch || — || align=right | 2.5 km || 
|-id=825 bgcolor=#d6d6d6
| 341825 ||  || — || January 10, 2008 || Mount Lemmon || Mount Lemmon Survey || SYL7:4 || align=right | 5.0 km || 
|-id=826 bgcolor=#d6d6d6
| 341826 Aurelbaier ||  ||  || January 10, 2008 || Marly || P. Kocher || — || align=right | 3.6 km || 
|-id=827 bgcolor=#d6d6d6
| 341827 ||  || — || January 12, 2008 || Mount Lemmon || Mount Lemmon Survey || HYG || align=right | 2.7 km || 
|-id=828 bgcolor=#d6d6d6
| 341828 ||  || — || January 18, 2008 || Pla D'Arguines || R. Ferrando || LIX || align=right | 3.8 km || 
|-id=829 bgcolor=#d6d6d6
| 341829 ||  || — || January 30, 2008 || Catalina || CSS || — || align=right | 5.5 km || 
|-id=830 bgcolor=#d6d6d6
| 341830 ||  || — || February 7, 2008 || Catalina || CSS || HIL3:2 || align=right | 8.0 km || 
|-id=831 bgcolor=#d6d6d6
| 341831 ||  || — || February 8, 2008 || Mount Lemmon || Mount Lemmon Survey || 3:2 || align=right | 5.2 km || 
|-id=832 bgcolor=#fefefe
| 341832 ||  || — || February 9, 2008 || Črni Vrh || Črni Vrh || H || align=right data-sort-value="0.62" | 620 m || 
|-id=833 bgcolor=#d6d6d6
| 341833 ||  || — || February 8, 2008 || Kitt Peak || Spacewatch || THM || align=right | 2.4 km || 
|-id=834 bgcolor=#d6d6d6
| 341834 ||  || — || February 9, 2008 || Mount Lemmon || Mount Lemmon Survey || — || align=right | 3.2 km || 
|-id=835 bgcolor=#d6d6d6
| 341835 ||  || — || February 8, 2008 || Mount Lemmon || Mount Lemmon Survey || SHU3:2 || align=right | 6.1 km || 
|-id=836 bgcolor=#d6d6d6
| 341836 ||  || — || February 9, 2008 || Mount Lemmon || Mount Lemmon Survey || EOS || align=right | 2.3 km || 
|-id=837 bgcolor=#fefefe
| 341837 ||  || — || February 8, 2008 || Kitt Peak || Spacewatch || NYS || align=right data-sort-value="0.58" | 580 m || 
|-id=838 bgcolor=#d6d6d6
| 341838 ||  || — || February 2, 2008 || Mount Lemmon || Mount Lemmon Survey || 3:2 || align=right | 4.1 km || 
|-id=839 bgcolor=#d6d6d6
| 341839 ||  || — || February 27, 2008 || Mayhill || W. G. Dillon || — || align=right | 2.9 km || 
|-id=840 bgcolor=#fefefe
| 341840 ||  || — || February 29, 2008 || Mount Lemmon || Mount Lemmon Survey || H || align=right data-sort-value="0.57" | 570 m || 
|-id=841 bgcolor=#d6d6d6
| 341841 ||  || — || February 29, 2008 || Mount Lemmon || Mount Lemmon Survey || HIL3:2 || align=right | 6.5 km || 
|-id=842 bgcolor=#d6d6d6
| 341842 ||  || — || February 27, 2008 || Catalina || CSS || 3:2 || align=right | 5.5 km || 
|-id=843 bgcolor=#FFC2E0
| 341843 ||  || — || March 4, 2008 || Mount Lemmon || Mount Lemmon Survey || ATEPHAcritical || align=right data-sort-value="0.4" | 400 m || 
|-id=844 bgcolor=#d6d6d6
| 341844 ||  || — || March 4, 2008 || Mount Lemmon || Mount Lemmon Survey || SHU3:2 || align=right | 7.3 km || 
|-id=845 bgcolor=#C2FFFF
| 341845 ||  || — || March 4, 2008 || Kitt Peak || Spacewatch || L5 || align=right | 10 km || 
|-id=846 bgcolor=#d6d6d6
| 341846 ||  || — || March 7, 2008 || Mount Lemmon || Mount Lemmon Survey || 7:4 || align=right | 3.7 km || 
|-id=847 bgcolor=#fefefe
| 341847 ||  || — || March 9, 2008 || Kitt Peak || Spacewatch || — || align=right data-sort-value="0.86" | 860 m || 
|-id=848 bgcolor=#fefefe
| 341848 ||  || — || March 1, 2008 || Kitt Peak || Spacewatch || — || align=right data-sort-value="0.82" | 820 m || 
|-id=849 bgcolor=#fefefe
| 341849 ||  || — || March 27, 2008 || Kitt Peak || Spacewatch || — || align=right data-sort-value="0.74" | 740 m || 
|-id=850 bgcolor=#fefefe
| 341850 ||  || — || March 27, 2008 || Kitt Peak || Spacewatch || FLO || align=right data-sort-value="0.64" | 640 m || 
|-id=851 bgcolor=#fefefe
| 341851 ||  || — || February 24, 2008 || Kitt Peak || Spacewatch || — || align=right data-sort-value="0.65" | 650 m || 
|-id=852 bgcolor=#fefefe
| 341852 ||  || — || March 28, 2008 || Kitt Peak || Spacewatch || FLO || align=right data-sort-value="0.64" | 640 m || 
|-id=853 bgcolor=#fefefe
| 341853 ||  || — || March 28, 2008 || Mount Lemmon || Mount Lemmon Survey || V || align=right data-sort-value="0.72" | 720 m || 
|-id=854 bgcolor=#C2FFFF
| 341854 ||  || — || March 27, 2008 || Kitt Peak || Spacewatch || L5 || align=right | 11 km || 
|-id=855 bgcolor=#fefefe
| 341855 ||  || — || March 27, 2008 || Mount Lemmon || Mount Lemmon Survey || — || align=right data-sort-value="0.72" | 720 m || 
|-id=856 bgcolor=#C2FFFF
| 341856 ||  || — || March 29, 2008 || Kitt Peak || Spacewatch || L5 || align=right | 8.5 km || 
|-id=857 bgcolor=#C2FFFF
| 341857 ||  || — || March 30, 2008 || Kitt Peak || Spacewatch || L5 || align=right | 9.3 km || 
|-id=858 bgcolor=#fefefe
| 341858 ||  || — || March 31, 2008 || Kitt Peak || Spacewatch || — || align=right data-sort-value="0.73" | 730 m || 
|-id=859 bgcolor=#fefefe
| 341859 ||  || — || March 31, 2008 || Kitt Peak || Spacewatch || — || align=right data-sort-value="0.75" | 750 m || 
|-id=860 bgcolor=#fefefe
| 341860 ||  || — || March 31, 2008 || Kitt Peak || Spacewatch || — || align=right data-sort-value="0.78" | 780 m || 
|-id=861 bgcolor=#C2FFFF
| 341861 ||  || — || March 31, 2008 || Kitt Peak || Spacewatch || L5 || align=right | 11 km || 
|-id=862 bgcolor=#fefefe
| 341862 ||  || — || March 29, 2008 || Kitt Peak || Spacewatch || — || align=right data-sort-value="0.82" | 820 m || 
|-id=863 bgcolor=#C2FFFF
| 341863 ||  || — || March 29, 2008 || Kitt Peak || Spacewatch || L5 || align=right | 11 km || 
|-id=864 bgcolor=#fefefe
| 341864 ||  || — || March 29, 2008 || Kitt Peak || Spacewatch || FLO || align=right data-sort-value="0.69" | 690 m || 
|-id=865 bgcolor=#C2FFFF
| 341865 ||  || — || March 29, 2008 || Kitt Peak || Spacewatch || L5 || align=right | 9.7 km || 
|-id=866 bgcolor=#fefefe
| 341866 ||  || — || February 2, 2008 || Mount Lemmon || Mount Lemmon Survey || FLO || align=right data-sort-value="0.57" | 570 m || 
|-id=867 bgcolor=#C2FFFF
| 341867 ||  || — || March 29, 2008 || Kitt Peak || Spacewatch || L5010 || align=right | 7.4 km || 
|-id=868 bgcolor=#fefefe
| 341868 ||  || — || April 4, 2008 || Wrightwood || J. W. Young || — || align=right data-sort-value="0.95" | 950 m || 
|-id=869 bgcolor=#C2FFFF
| 341869 ||  || — || April 1, 2008 || Kitt Peak || Spacewatch || L5 || align=right | 13 km || 
|-id=870 bgcolor=#C2FFFF
| 341870 ||  || — || April 3, 2008 || Kitt Peak || Spacewatch || L5 || align=right | 15 km || 
|-id=871 bgcolor=#fefefe
| 341871 ||  || — || April 3, 2008 || Mount Lemmon || Mount Lemmon Survey || FLO || align=right data-sort-value="0.49" | 490 m || 
|-id=872 bgcolor=#C2FFFF
| 341872 ||  || — || April 4, 2008 || Kitt Peak || Spacewatch || L5 || align=right | 9.4 km || 
|-id=873 bgcolor=#fefefe
| 341873 ||  || — || April 4, 2008 || Kitt Peak || Spacewatch || — || align=right data-sort-value="0.93" | 930 m || 
|-id=874 bgcolor=#fefefe
| 341874 ||  || — || April 5, 2008 || Mount Lemmon || Mount Lemmon Survey || — || align=right data-sort-value="0.75" | 750 m || 
|-id=875 bgcolor=#C2FFFF
| 341875 ||  || — || April 5, 2008 || Mount Lemmon || Mount Lemmon Survey || L5 || align=right | 9.6 km || 
|-id=876 bgcolor=#fefefe
| 341876 ||  || — || April 7, 2008 || Kitt Peak || Spacewatch || — || align=right data-sort-value="0.68" | 680 m || 
|-id=877 bgcolor=#C2FFFF
| 341877 ||  || — || April 7, 2008 || Kitt Peak || Spacewatch || L5 || align=right | 9.5 km || 
|-id=878 bgcolor=#fefefe
| 341878 ||  || — || April 9, 2008 || Kitt Peak || Spacewatch || — || align=right data-sort-value="0.78" | 780 m || 
|-id=879 bgcolor=#fefefe
| 341879 ||  || — || April 9, 2008 || Mount Lemmon || Mount Lemmon Survey || — || align=right data-sort-value="0.84" | 840 m || 
|-id=880 bgcolor=#C2FFFF
| 341880 ||  || — || April 5, 2008 || Mount Lemmon || Mount Lemmon Survey || L5 || align=right | 16 km || 
|-id=881 bgcolor=#C2FFFF
| 341881 ||  || — || April 7, 2008 || Kitt Peak || Spacewatch || L5 || align=right | 9.5 km || 
|-id=882 bgcolor=#fefefe
| 341882 ||  || — || April 9, 2008 || Kitt Peak || Spacewatch || — || align=right data-sort-value="0.94" | 940 m || 
|-id=883 bgcolor=#d6d6d6
| 341883 ||  || — || April 11, 2008 || Kitt Peak || Spacewatch || HIL3:2 || align=right | 6.5 km || 
|-id=884 bgcolor=#fefefe
| 341884 ||  || — || July 30, 2005 || Palomar || NEAT || — || align=right data-sort-value="0.78" | 780 m || 
|-id=885 bgcolor=#fefefe
| 341885 ||  || — || April 7, 2008 || Kitt Peak || Spacewatch || FLO || align=right data-sort-value="0.53" | 530 m || 
|-id=886 bgcolor=#C2FFFF
| 341886 ||  || — || April 10, 2008 || Kitt Peak || Spacewatch || L5 || align=right | 9.5 km || 
|-id=887 bgcolor=#fefefe
| 341887 ||  || — || April 3, 2008 || Kitt Peak || Spacewatch || — || align=right data-sort-value="0.66" | 660 m || 
|-id=888 bgcolor=#C2FFFF
| 341888 ||  || — || April 14, 2008 || Mount Lemmon || Mount Lemmon Survey || L5 || align=right | 8.2 km || 
|-id=889 bgcolor=#fefefe
| 341889 ||  || — || April 16, 2008 || Mount Lemmon || Mount Lemmon Survey || H || align=right data-sort-value="0.82" | 820 m || 
|-id=890 bgcolor=#fefefe
| 341890 ||  || — || April 1, 2008 || Kitt Peak || Spacewatch || V || align=right data-sort-value="0.80" | 800 m || 
|-id=891 bgcolor=#C2FFFF
| 341891 ||  || — || March 31, 2008 || Mount Lemmon || Mount Lemmon Survey || L5 || align=right | 9.2 km || 
|-id=892 bgcolor=#C2FFFF
| 341892 ||  || — || April 26, 2008 || Mount Lemmon || Mount Lemmon Survey || L5 || align=right | 9.7 km || 
|-id=893 bgcolor=#fefefe
| 341893 ||  || — || April 26, 2008 || Kitt Peak || Spacewatch || — || align=right data-sort-value="0.64" | 640 m || 
|-id=894 bgcolor=#C2FFFF
| 341894 ||  || — || April 26, 2008 || Mount Lemmon || Mount Lemmon Survey || L5 || align=right | 13 km || 
|-id=895 bgcolor=#fefefe
| 341895 ||  || — || April 26, 2008 || Mount Lemmon || Mount Lemmon Survey || FLO || align=right data-sort-value="0.65" | 650 m || 
|-id=896 bgcolor=#fefefe
| 341896 ||  || — || April 30, 2008 || Kitt Peak || Spacewatch || fast? || align=right data-sort-value="0.91" | 910 m || 
|-id=897 bgcolor=#C2FFFF
| 341897 ||  || — || April 27, 2008 || Mount Lemmon || Mount Lemmon Survey || L5 || align=right | 7.6 km || 
|-id=898 bgcolor=#fefefe
| 341898 ||  || — || April 29, 2008 || Kitt Peak || Spacewatch || FLO || align=right data-sort-value="0.59" | 590 m || 
|-id=899 bgcolor=#fefefe
| 341899 ||  || — || April 29, 2008 || Kitt Peak || Spacewatch || — || align=right data-sort-value="0.91" | 910 m || 
|-id=900 bgcolor=#C2FFFF
| 341900 ||  || — || April 29, 2008 || Kitt Peak || Spacewatch || L5 || align=right | 10 km || 
|}

341901–342000 

|-bgcolor=#fefefe
| 341901 ||  || — || April 29, 2008 || Kitt Peak || Spacewatch || — || align=right data-sort-value="0.76" | 760 m || 
|-id=902 bgcolor=#fefefe
| 341902 ||  || — || April 27, 2008 || Mount Lemmon || Mount Lemmon Survey || — || align=right data-sort-value="0.94" | 940 m || 
|-id=903 bgcolor=#fefefe
| 341903 ||  || — || April 30, 2008 || Mount Lemmon || Mount Lemmon Survey || — || align=right data-sort-value="0.80" | 800 m || 
|-id=904 bgcolor=#fefefe
| 341904 ||  || — || April 24, 2008 || Kitt Peak || Spacewatch || — || align=right data-sort-value="0.77" | 770 m || 
|-id=905 bgcolor=#fefefe
| 341905 ||  || — || May 2, 2008 || Kitt Peak || Spacewatch || — || align=right data-sort-value="0.77" | 770 m || 
|-id=906 bgcolor=#fefefe
| 341906 ||  || — || May 3, 2008 || Socorro || LINEAR || — || align=right | 3.0 km || 
|-id=907 bgcolor=#fefefe
| 341907 ||  || — || May 3, 2008 || Kitt Peak || Spacewatch || — || align=right data-sort-value="0.86" | 860 m || 
|-id=908 bgcolor=#fefefe
| 341908 ||  || — || May 6, 2008 || Mount Lemmon || Mount Lemmon Survey || — || align=right data-sort-value="0.94" | 940 m || 
|-id=909 bgcolor=#C2FFFF
| 341909 ||  || — || May 3, 2008 || Mount Lemmon || Mount Lemmon Survey || L5 || align=right | 8.6 km || 
|-id=910 bgcolor=#fefefe
| 341910 ||  || — || May 9, 2008 || Grove Creek || F. Tozzi || — || align=right data-sort-value="0.87" | 870 m || 
|-id=911 bgcolor=#fefefe
| 341911 ||  || — || May 11, 2008 || Catalina || CSS || PHO || align=right | 1.1 km || 
|-id=912 bgcolor=#fefefe
| 341912 ||  || — || May 5, 2008 || Mount Lemmon || Mount Lemmon Survey || NYS || align=right | 2.3 km || 
|-id=913 bgcolor=#d6d6d6
| 341913 ||  || — || May 8, 2008 || Mount Lemmon || Mount Lemmon Survey || — || align=right | 3.6 km || 
|-id=914 bgcolor=#fefefe
| 341914 ||  || — || May 26, 2008 || Kitt Peak || Spacewatch || — || align=right data-sort-value="0.98" | 980 m || 
|-id=915 bgcolor=#d6d6d6
| 341915 ||  || — || May 26, 2008 || Kitt Peak || Spacewatch || LIX || align=right | 4.3 km || 
|-id=916 bgcolor=#fefefe
| 341916 ||  || — || May 26, 2008 || Kitt Peak || Spacewatch || FLO || align=right data-sort-value="0.71" | 710 m || 
|-id=917 bgcolor=#C2FFFF
| 341917 ||  || — || May 27, 2008 || Kitt Peak || Spacewatch || L5 || align=right | 8.3 km || 
|-id=918 bgcolor=#fefefe
| 341918 ||  || — || May 2, 2008 || Kitt Peak || Spacewatch || — || align=right data-sort-value="0.67" | 670 m || 
|-id=919 bgcolor=#C2FFFF
| 341919 ||  || — || May 28, 2008 || Kitt Peak || Spacewatch || L5 || align=right | 12 km || 
|-id=920 bgcolor=#fefefe
| 341920 ||  || — || May 28, 2008 || Mount Lemmon || Mount Lemmon Survey || — || align=right data-sort-value="0.64" | 640 m || 
|-id=921 bgcolor=#fefefe
| 341921 ||  || — || May 28, 2008 || Mount Lemmon || Mount Lemmon Survey || NYS || align=right data-sort-value="0.76" | 760 m || 
|-id=922 bgcolor=#C2FFFF
| 341922 ||  || — || May 27, 2008 || Kitt Peak || Spacewatch || L5 || align=right | 8.7 km || 
|-id=923 bgcolor=#C2FFFF
| 341923 ||  || — || May 30, 2008 || Kitt Peak || Spacewatch || L5 || align=right | 11 km || 
|-id=924 bgcolor=#fefefe
| 341924 ||  || — || May 31, 2008 || Grove Creek || F. Tozzi || FLO || align=right data-sort-value="0.62" | 620 m || 
|-id=925 bgcolor=#C2FFFF
| 341925 ||  || — || May 27, 2008 || Kitt Peak || Spacewatch || L5 || align=right | 12 km || 
|-id=926 bgcolor=#C2FFFF
| 341926 ||  || — || April 1, 2008 || Kitt Peak || Spacewatch || L5 || align=right | 7.3 km || 
|-id=927 bgcolor=#fefefe
| 341927 ||  || — || June 3, 2008 || Mount Lemmon || Mount Lemmon Survey || — || align=right | 1.1 km || 
|-id=928 bgcolor=#C2FFFF
| 341928 ||  || — || June 3, 2008 || Kitt Peak || Spacewatch || L5 || align=right | 18 km || 
|-id=929 bgcolor=#fefefe
| 341929 ||  || — || June 30, 2008 || Kitt Peak || Spacewatch || — || align=right data-sort-value="0.97" | 970 m || 
|-id=930 bgcolor=#fefefe
| 341930 ||  || — || July 10, 2008 || La Sagra || OAM Obs. || — || align=right | 1.2 km || 
|-id=931 bgcolor=#fefefe
| 341931 ||  || — || July 10, 2008 || Črni Vrh || Črni Vrh || FLO || align=right data-sort-value="0.81" | 810 m || 
|-id=932 bgcolor=#fefefe
| 341932 ||  || — || June 2, 2008 || Mount Lemmon || Mount Lemmon Survey || — || align=right | 1.0 km || 
|-id=933 bgcolor=#fefefe
| 341933 ||  || — || July 28, 2008 || Hibiscus || S. F. Hönig, N. Teamo || NYS || align=right data-sort-value="0.72" | 720 m || 
|-id=934 bgcolor=#fefefe
| 341934 ||  || — || July 29, 2008 || Mount Lemmon || Mount Lemmon Survey || — || align=right | 1.1 km || 
|-id=935 bgcolor=#fefefe
| 341935 ||  || — || July 28, 2008 || Dauban || F. Kugel || — || align=right data-sort-value="0.90" | 900 m || 
|-id=936 bgcolor=#fefefe
| 341936 ||  || — || July 28, 2008 || Hibiscus || S. F. Hönig, N. Teamo || MAS || align=right data-sort-value="0.94" | 940 m || 
|-id=937 bgcolor=#fefefe
| 341937 ||  || — || July 29, 2008 || La Sagra || OAM Obs. || NYS || align=right data-sort-value="0.68" | 680 m || 
|-id=938 bgcolor=#fefefe
| 341938 ||  || — || July 30, 2008 || Calvin-Rehoboth || L. A. Molnar || — || align=right data-sort-value="0.84" | 840 m || 
|-id=939 bgcolor=#fefefe
| 341939 ||  || — || July 31, 2008 || Socorro || LINEAR || ERI || align=right | 1.9 km || 
|-id=940 bgcolor=#fefefe
| 341940 ||  || — || July 30, 2008 || Kitt Peak || Spacewatch || V || align=right data-sort-value="0.75" | 750 m || 
|-id=941 bgcolor=#fefefe
| 341941 ||  || — || July 30, 2008 || Catalina || CSS || — || align=right | 1.2 km || 
|-id=942 bgcolor=#fefefe
| 341942 ||  || — || July 28, 2008 || Siding Spring || SSS || NYS || align=right data-sort-value="0.94" | 940 m || 
|-id=943 bgcolor=#fefefe
| 341943 ||  || — || July 26, 2008 || Siding Spring || SSS || — || align=right | 1.2 km || 
|-id=944 bgcolor=#fefefe
| 341944 ||  || — || August 1, 2008 || Hibiscus || S. F. Hönig, N. Teamo || V || align=right data-sort-value="0.80" | 800 m || 
|-id=945 bgcolor=#fefefe
| 341945 ||  || — || August 1, 2008 || Hibiscus || S. F. Hönig, N. Teamo || NYS || align=right data-sort-value="0.88" | 880 m || 
|-id=946 bgcolor=#fefefe
| 341946 ||  || — || August 1, 2008 || Socorro || LINEAR || — || align=right | 1.3 km || 
|-id=947 bgcolor=#fefefe
| 341947 ||  || — || August 1, 2008 || La Sagra || OAM Obs. || — || align=right data-sort-value="0.97" | 970 m || 
|-id=948 bgcolor=#fefefe
| 341948 ||  || — || August 2, 2008 || La Sagra || OAM Obs. || — || align=right | 2.7 km || 
|-id=949 bgcolor=#fefefe
| 341949 ||  || — || August 3, 2008 || Dauban || F. Kugel || MAS || align=right data-sort-value="0.83" | 830 m || 
|-id=950 bgcolor=#fefefe
| 341950 ||  || — || August 4, 2008 || Siding Spring || SSS || — || align=right data-sort-value="0.98" | 980 m || 
|-id=951 bgcolor=#fefefe
| 341951 ||  || — || August 5, 2008 || La Sagra || OAM Obs. || V || align=right data-sort-value="0.98" | 980 m || 
|-id=952 bgcolor=#fefefe
| 341952 ||  || — || August 10, 2008 || Pla D'Arguines || R. Ferrando || — || align=right data-sort-value="0.87" | 870 m || 
|-id=953 bgcolor=#fefefe
| 341953 ||  || — || August 11, 2008 || Pla D'Arguines || R. Ferrando || NYS || align=right data-sort-value="0.63" | 630 m || 
|-id=954 bgcolor=#fefefe
| 341954 ||  || — || August 7, 2008 || Kitt Peak || Spacewatch || MAS || align=right data-sort-value="0.66" | 660 m || 
|-id=955 bgcolor=#fefefe
| 341955 ||  || — || August 5, 2008 || Siding Spring || SSS || — || align=right | 1.3 km || 
|-id=956 bgcolor=#fefefe
| 341956 ||  || — || August 3, 2008 || Siding Spring || SSS || — || align=right | 1.2 km || 
|-id=957 bgcolor=#fefefe
| 341957 ||  || — || August 6, 2008 || Siding Spring || SSS || — || align=right | 1.1 km || 
|-id=958 bgcolor=#fefefe
| 341958 Chrétien ||  ||  || August 3, 2008 || Eygalayes Obs. || P. Sogorb || — || align=right | 1.1 km || 
|-id=959 bgcolor=#fefefe
| 341959 || 2008 QM || — || August 21, 2008 || Piszkéstető || K. Sárneczky || MAS || align=right data-sort-value="0.78" | 780 m || 
|-id=960 bgcolor=#fefefe
| 341960 ||  || — || August 23, 2008 || La Sagra || OAM Obs. || MAS || align=right data-sort-value="0.99" | 990 m || 
|-id=961 bgcolor=#fefefe
| 341961 ||  || — || August 23, 2008 || La Sagra || OAM Obs. || MAS || align=right data-sort-value="0.90" | 900 m || 
|-id=962 bgcolor=#E9E9E9
| 341962 ||  || — || August 24, 2008 || La Sagra || OAM Obs. || EUN || align=right | 1.1 km || 
|-id=963 bgcolor=#fefefe
| 341963 ||  || — || August 24, 2008 || La Sagra || OAM Obs. || — || align=right data-sort-value="0.91" | 910 m || 
|-id=964 bgcolor=#fefefe
| 341964 ||  || — || August 21, 2008 || Kitt Peak || Spacewatch || — || align=right data-sort-value="0.79" | 790 m || 
|-id=965 bgcolor=#fefefe
| 341965 ||  || — || August 21, 2008 || Kitt Peak || Spacewatch || V || align=right data-sort-value="0.90" | 900 m || 
|-id=966 bgcolor=#fefefe
| 341966 ||  || — || August 26, 2008 || La Sagra || OAM Obs. || — || align=right data-sort-value="0.88" | 880 m || 
|-id=967 bgcolor=#E9E9E9
| 341967 ||  || — || January 30, 2006 || Kitt Peak || Spacewatch || — || align=right data-sort-value="0.73" | 730 m || 
|-id=968 bgcolor=#fefefe
| 341968 ||  || — || August 21, 2008 || Kitt Peak || Spacewatch || — || align=right | 1.1 km || 
|-id=969 bgcolor=#fefefe
| 341969 ||  || — || August 28, 2008 || Dauban || F. Kugel || NYS || align=right data-sort-value="0.85" | 850 m || 
|-id=970 bgcolor=#fefefe
| 341970 ||  || — || August 21, 2008 || Kitt Peak || Spacewatch || NYS || align=right data-sort-value="0.82" | 820 m || 
|-id=971 bgcolor=#fefefe
| 341971 ||  || — || August 27, 2008 || La Sagra || OAM Obs. || V || align=right data-sort-value="0.89" | 890 m || 
|-id=972 bgcolor=#E9E9E9
| 341972 ||  || — || August 25, 2008 || Socorro || LINEAR || JUN || align=right | 1.7 km || 
|-id=973 bgcolor=#fefefe
| 341973 ||  || — || August 29, 2008 || La Sagra || OAM Obs. || MAS || align=right data-sort-value="0.99" | 990 m || 
|-id=974 bgcolor=#fefefe
| 341974 ||  || — || August 30, 2008 || Socorro || LINEAR || — || align=right | 1.0 km || 
|-id=975 bgcolor=#fefefe
| 341975 ||  || — || August 21, 2008 || Kitt Peak || Spacewatch || — || align=right data-sort-value="0.67" | 670 m || 
|-id=976 bgcolor=#fefefe
| 341976 ||  || — || August 21, 2008 || Kitt Peak || Spacewatch || NYS || align=right data-sort-value="0.71" | 710 m || 
|-id=977 bgcolor=#E9E9E9
| 341977 ||  || — || August 23, 2008 || Kitt Peak || Spacewatch || — || align=right data-sort-value="0.91" | 910 m || 
|-id=978 bgcolor=#E9E9E9
| 341978 ||  || — || August 24, 2008 || Kitt Peak || Spacewatch || EUN || align=right | 1.5 km || 
|-id=979 bgcolor=#E9E9E9
| 341979 ||  || — || August 24, 2008 || Kitt Peak || Spacewatch || — || align=right | 1.4 km || 
|-id=980 bgcolor=#fefefe
| 341980 ||  || — || August 26, 2008 || La Sagra || OAM Obs. || — || align=right | 1.0 km || 
|-id=981 bgcolor=#fefefe
| 341981 ||  || — || August 27, 2008 || La Sagra || OAM Obs. || NYS || align=right data-sort-value="0.72" | 720 m || 
|-id=982 bgcolor=#E9E9E9
| 341982 ||  || — || August 24, 2008 || Kitt Peak || Spacewatch || — || align=right | 1.2 km || 
|-id=983 bgcolor=#E9E9E9
| 341983 ||  || — || August 24, 2008 || Kitt Peak || Spacewatch || — || align=right | 3.1 km || 
|-id=984 bgcolor=#fefefe
| 341984 ||  || — || August 23, 2008 || Kitt Peak || Spacewatch || MAS || align=right data-sort-value="0.90" | 900 m || 
|-id=985 bgcolor=#fefefe
| 341985 ||  || — || August 24, 2008 || Socorro || LINEAR || — || align=right | 1.2 km || 
|-id=986 bgcolor=#fefefe
| 341986 ||  || — || August 26, 2008 || Socorro || LINEAR || V || align=right data-sort-value="0.82" | 820 m || 
|-id=987 bgcolor=#E9E9E9
| 341987 ||  || — || August 23, 2008 || Socorro || LINEAR || — || align=right data-sort-value="0.94" | 940 m || 
|-id=988 bgcolor=#fefefe
| 341988 ||  || — || August 24, 2008 || Kitt Peak || Spacewatch || — || align=right data-sort-value="0.94" | 940 m || 
|-id=989 bgcolor=#E9E9E9
| 341989 ||  || — || September 2, 2008 || Kitt Peak || Spacewatch || — || align=right | 2.4 km || 
|-id=990 bgcolor=#fefefe
| 341990 ||  || — || September 2, 2008 || Kitt Peak || Spacewatch || — || align=right | 1.1 km || 
|-id=991 bgcolor=#fefefe
| 341991 ||  || — || September 2, 2008 || Kitt Peak || Spacewatch || NYS || align=right data-sort-value="0.85" | 850 m || 
|-id=992 bgcolor=#E9E9E9
| 341992 ||  || — || September 3, 2008 || Kitt Peak || Spacewatch || — || align=right data-sort-value="0.94" | 940 m || 
|-id=993 bgcolor=#fefefe
| 341993 ||  || — || September 3, 2008 || Kitt Peak || Spacewatch || NYS || align=right data-sort-value="0.86" | 860 m || 
|-id=994 bgcolor=#fefefe
| 341994 ||  || — || September 4, 2008 || Kitt Peak || Spacewatch || — || align=right data-sort-value="0.81" | 810 m || 
|-id=995 bgcolor=#E9E9E9
| 341995 ||  || — || September 4, 2008 || Kitt Peak || Spacewatch || — || align=right data-sort-value="0.71" | 710 m || 
|-id=996 bgcolor=#E9E9E9
| 341996 ||  || — || September 4, 2008 || Kitt Peak || Spacewatch || — || align=right data-sort-value="0.91" | 910 m || 
|-id=997 bgcolor=#fefefe
| 341997 ||  || — || September 3, 2008 || La Sagra || OAM Obs. || — || align=right data-sort-value="0.92" | 920 m || 
|-id=998 bgcolor=#E9E9E9
| 341998 ||  || — || September 5, 2008 || Socorro || LINEAR || — || align=right | 3.2 km || 
|-id=999 bgcolor=#fefefe
| 341999 ||  || — || September 5, 2008 || Needville || J. Dellinger, C. Sexton || — || align=right | 2.4 km || 
|-id=000 bgcolor=#fefefe
| 342000 Neumünster ||  ||  || September 2, 2008 || Altschwendt || W. Ries || — || align=right | 1.0 km || 
|}

References

External links 
 Discovery Circumstances: Numbered Minor Planets (340001)–(345000) (IAU Minor Planet Center)

0341